= Man: Whence, How and Whither, a Record of Clairvoyant Investigation =

Theosophical book published in 1913

Man: Whence, How and Whither
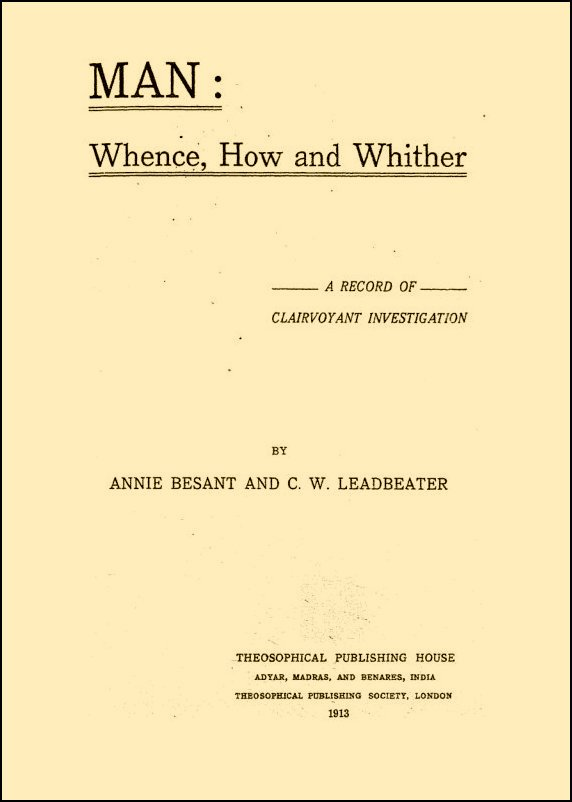
- Title page to the first edition, 1913
- Authors: A. Besant, C. W. Leadbeater
- Language: English
- Subject: Theosophy
- Publisher: Theosophical Publishing House
- Publication date: 1913 (1st edition)
- Publication place: British India
- Pages: 524
- OCLC: 871602
- Text: Man: Whence, How and Whither online

Man: Whence, How and Whither, A Record of Clairvoyant Investigation, published in 1913, is a theosophical book compiled by the second president of the Theosophical Society (TS) - Adyar, Annie Besant, and by a TS member, Charles W. Leadbeater. (Note: According to WorldCat, "18 editions published between 1913 and 1984 in English and held by 177 WorldCat member libraries worldwide.") The book is a study on early times on planetary chains, beginnings of early root races, early civilizations and empires, and past lives of men. (Note: There were other collaborative authors clairvoyant works, Occult Chemistry (1908) and The Lives of Alcyone (1924).)

== Introduction ==
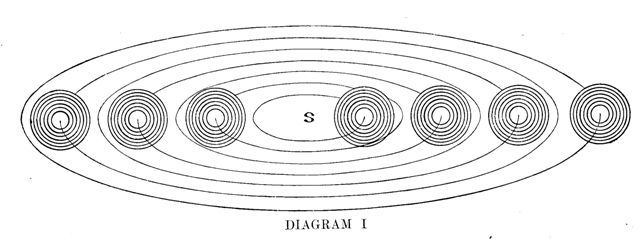
The seven Schemes of our Solar System. (Note: "At any one period of time only one of the rings in each Scheme will be active; each ring of each of these seven Schemes is composed of seven globes.")

At the beginning of the book the authors wrote that "metaphysicians, ancient and modern, declare that Past, Present, and Future are ever simultaneously existent in the divine Consciousness, and are only successive as they come into manifestation, i.e., under Time which is verily the succession of states of consciousness." Hence, when a mystic turns the soul away from earth and focuses his attention upon the spirit – the soul may approach the "Memory of Nature", the personification in the material world of the "Thoughts of the Logos," the image, as it were, of "His Mind." There resides the Past in ever-living records.

The authors say that "they, having been taught the method of gaining touch, but being subject to the difficulties involved in their uncompleted evolution, have done their best to observe and transmit, but are fully conscious of the many weaknesses which mar their work. Occasional help has been given to them by the Elder Brethren."

== Explorations of past lives ==
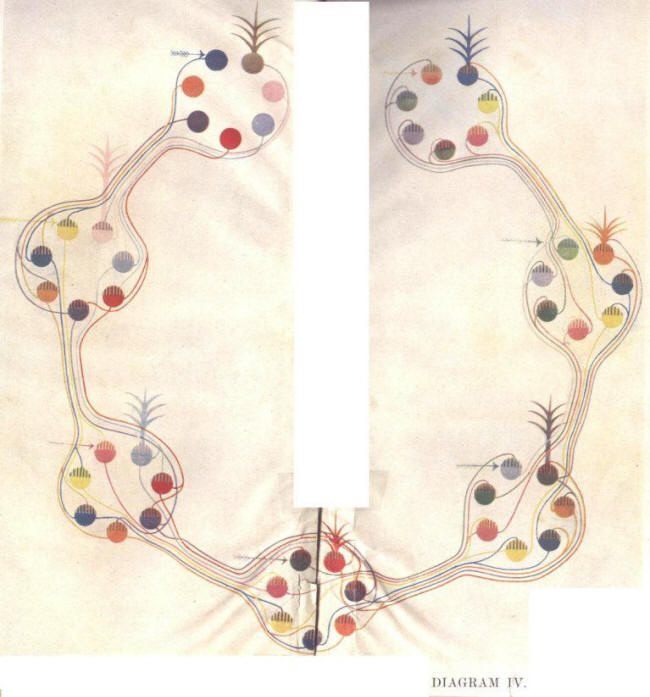
Seven planetary chains and seven kingdoms.

Leadbeater speculated that "the total number of souls, or Monads, making up humanity was sixty thousand million, the majority being out of incarnation at any given time." Thus reincarnation had been one of the doctrines of the Theosophical Society almost from its beginnings. The principal characters (so-called "star names" or pseudonyms) are identified in the following table. (Note: Drawn from the lists in the book.) (Note: Leadbeater talked in The Inner Life that "about a hundred and fifty of those who are at present members of the Theosophical Society are the prominent characters in the drama which lies before the readers of The Theosophist.")

1. Alcyone — Krishnamurti. (Note: Kuhn wrote that Alcyone is Krishnamurti's "true or cosmic name.")
2. Fides — G. Arundale.
3. Herakles — Besant. (Note: Jinarajadasa claimed that Besant was Bruno; Senkevich wrote that Besant was Bruno, and Bruno earlier was Hipatia. Alone Roerich claimed: "Giordano Bruno has been the incarnation of the Gr.[eat] Mas.[ter] Hilarion. But... theosophists falsely have ascribed this incarnation to An.[nie] Besant.")
4. Lomia — Wedgwood.
5. Phocea — Judge.
6. Polaris — Wadia.
7. Selene — Jinarajadasa.
8. Sirius — Leadbeater. (Note: Jinarajadasa claimed that, "Mr. Leadbeater knew the details of his incarnation as a Greek in Athens.")
9. Siwa — Subba Row.
10. Spica — F. Arundale.
11. Ulysses — Olcott. (Note: About Olcott's past life see in the chapter XXII.)
12. Vajra — Blavatsky. (Note: About Blavatsky's past life see The Hidden Life in Freemasonry by C.W. Leadbeater.)

Leadbeater wrote later that "the two hundred and fifty characters to whom names have been assigned are supposed to be less than one tenth of the whole". Professor Joscelyn Godwin said, "The series of incarnations showed these pioneers going through their own evolution from subhumans to worldly and spiritual leaders of the race."

== Early root races ==
=== In Lemuria ===
In the chapter VII the authors describe in detail (Note: "Leadbeater wrote elaborate descriptions of these things in a style of simplicity and clearness," — claimed Kuhn.) a remarkable Lemurian:

"In Lemuria there was some domestication of animals; the egg-headed Lemurian (Note: Blavatsky stated that the Lemurian is "the first physical man which itself took place 18,000,000 years ago.") was seen leading about a scaly monster, almost as unattractive as his master. Animals of all sorts were eaten raw – among some tribes human flesh was not despised – and creatures of the grade of our slugs, snails and worms, much larger than their degenerate descendants, were regarded with peculiar favor as toothsome morsels." (Note: Professor Joscelyn Godwin wrote, "Leadbeater regularly adopts an archly humorous tone when dealing with disgusting habits, ugly people, or lowly human types.")

=== In Atlantis ===
In the chapter IX the authors wrote about Atlantis that "explosions of gas, floods and earthquakes" razed Ruta and Daitya, the great islands, left from the cataclysm of 200,000 B.C., and only the island of Poseidonis remained, the last vestige of the once grand continent of the Atlantis. These islands were lost in 75,025 B.C., Poseidonis survived to 9,564 B.C., when it also was devoured by the ocean.

The authors assert in the chapter X of the book:

"The immense growth of wealth and of luxury gradually undermined the most splendid civilization that the world has yet seen. Knowledge was prostituted to individual gain, and control over the powers of nature was turned from service to oppression. Hence Atlantis fell, despite the glory of its achievements and the might of its Empires." (Note: Blavatsky claimed, "The civilization of the Atlanteans was greater even than that of the Egyptians. It is their degenerate descendants, the nation of Plato's Atlantis, which built the first Pyramids... The great Pyramid must have been built 78,000 years ago.")

== On the Moon chain ==
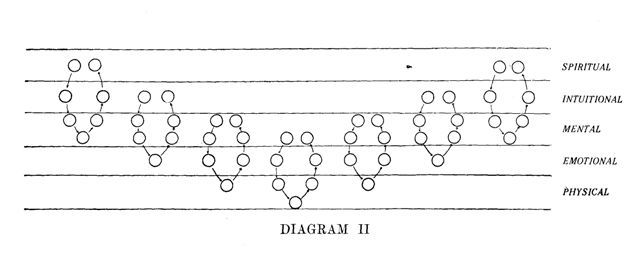
The seven planetary chains and the five planes.

Blavatsky wrote in The Secret Doctrine that the Moon "plays the largest and most important part, as well in the formation of the Earth itself, as in the peopling thereof with human beings". The "Lunar Monads" or Pitris, the progenitors of man, become in reality man himself. A religious studies scholar Isaac Lubelsky stated that Besant and Leadbeater write in the book the chain of the Moon "was an evolutionary precursor of the chain of the planet Earth."

In the chapter III the authors describe in detail how Sirius, Alcyone, Herakles and Mizar (Note: Mizar — J. Nityananda (drawn from the lists in the book).) achieved individualization (Note: "The divine life begins the evolution of consciousness, building for itself forms on the various planes, passing slowly through the elemental, mineral, vegetable, and animal kingdoms, and finally reaching self-consciousness and individualization, when it passes into the human stage.") and left the animal kingdom while living as lunar monkey-creatures. (Note: The lunar manvantara generated seven classes of the entities for the earthly manvantara.) They were servants to a family of lunar men, the leaders of which are now the Masters M. and K.H. (Note: M. — Mars, K.H. — Mercury (drawn from the lists in the book).) Leadbeater wrote that "individualization from the animal kingdom usually takes place through association with the humanity of the period. Such examples of it as we occasionally see taking place round us at the present time will serve as instances for us." Some peculiar domestic animal, well treated by its human friends, is stimulated by its permanent contact with them up to the point where it breaks away from the group-soul to which it has previously belonged. The authors wrote:

"One night there is an alarm; the hut is surrounded by savages, supported by their domesticated animals, fierce and strong, resembling furry lizards and crocodiles. The faithful guardians spring up around their master's hut and fight desperately in its defence; Mars comes out and drives back the assailants, using some weapons they do not possess; but, while he drives them backward, a lizard-like creature darts behind him into the hut, and catching up the child Surya (Note: "Surya — the Lord Maitreya, the present Bodhisattva, the Supreme Teacher of the world" (drawn from the lists in the book).) begins to carry him away. Sirius springs at him, bearing him down, and throws the child to Alcyone, who carries him back into the hut, while Sirius grapples with the lizard, and, after a desperate struggle, kills it, falling senseless, badly mangled, over its body. Meanwhile, a savage slips behind Mars and stabs at his back, but Herakles, with one leap, flings himself between his master and the weapon and receives the blow full on his breast, and falls, dying. The savages are now flying in all directions, and Mars, feeling the fall of some creature against his back, staggers, and, recovering himself, turns. He recognizes his faithful animal defender, bends over his dying servant, and places his head in his lap. The poor monkey lifts his eyes, full of intense devotion, to his master's face, and the act of service done, with passionate desire to save, calls down a stream of response from the Will aspect of the Monad in a fierce rush of power, and in the very moment of dying the monkey individualizes, and thus he dies – a man."

== Fruits of Evolution ==
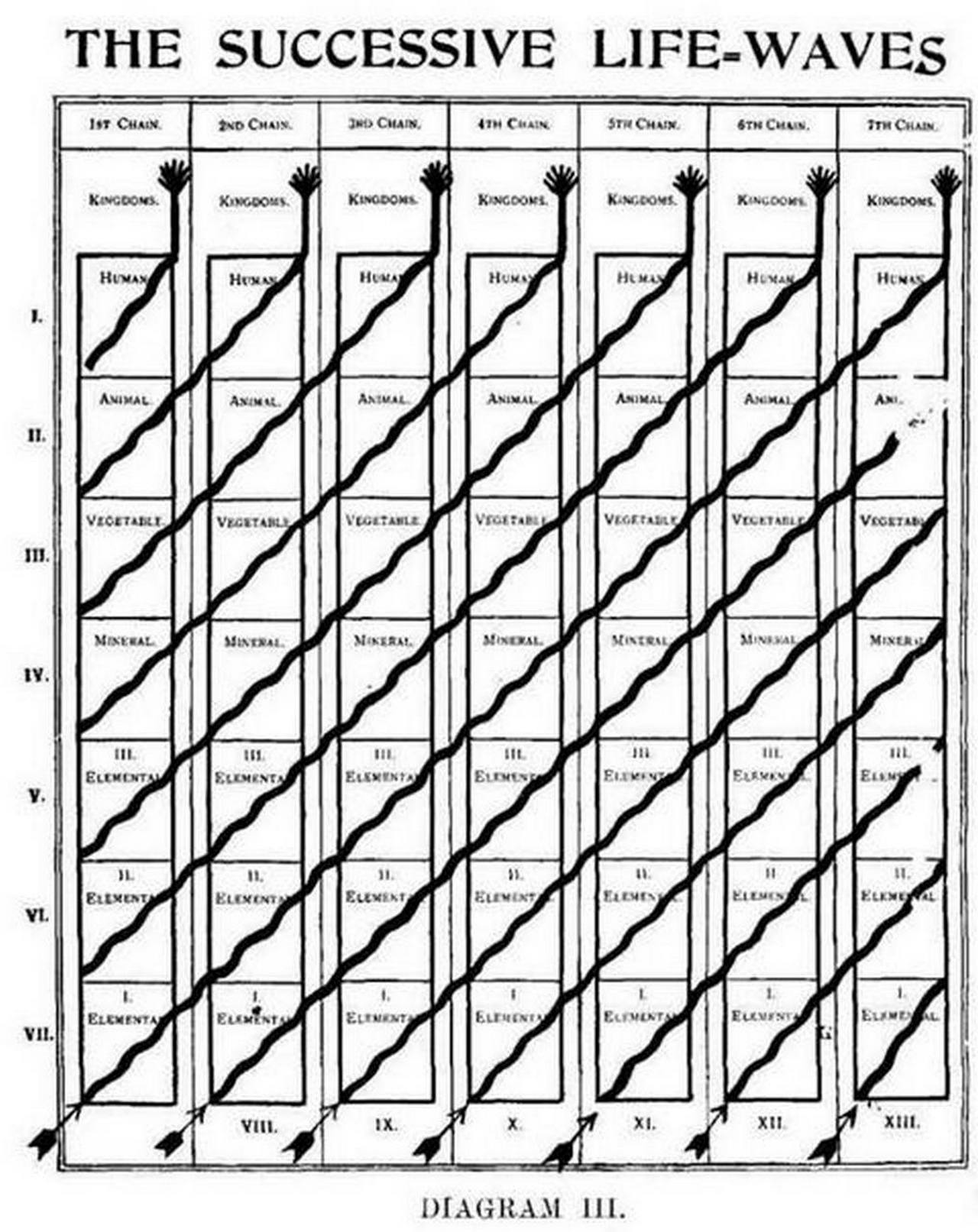
Successive Life-waves. (Note: "The vertical columns indicate the successive incarnations of the Chain; the horizontal divisions represent the various kingdoms of nature; the diagonal arrows are the successive waves of Evolution which have come forth from the Logos.")

The theosophical concept of evolution holds that humanity's spiritual development will ultimately attain Buddhahood or a Christ-like nature, which Christianity calls 'the prize of the high calling of God.'

The authors of the book proclaimed that "when the Human Kingdom is traversed, and man stands on the threshold of His superhuman life, a liberated Spirit", seven paths open before Him for His choosing: He may enter into the blissful omniscience and omnipotence of Nirvana, with activities far beyond our knowing, to become, perchance, in some future world an Avatara, or godlike Incarnation; this is sometimes called, "taking the Dharmakaya vesture". He may enter on "the Spiritual Period" — a phrase including unknown meanings, among them probably that of "taking the Sambhogakaya vesture". He may become part of that treasure-house of spiritual forces on which the Agents of the Logos draw for Their work, "taking the Nirmanakaya vesture". He may remain a member of the Occult Hierarchy which rules and guards the world in which He has reached perfection. He may pass on to the next Chain, to aid in constructing its forms. He may enter the majestic Angel – Deva-Evolution. He may give Himself to the immediate service of the Logos, to be used by Him in any part of the Solar System, His Servant and Messenger, who lives but to carry out His will and do His work over the whole of the system which He controls.

== Criticism ==
A religious studies scholar Alvin Kuhn wrote in his thesis that The Canadian Theosophist, a magazine published at Toronto, announced a series of articles in which "parallel passages from the writings of Mrs. Blavatsky and the Mahatma Letters on one side, and from the books of Mrs. Besant and Mr. Leadbeater, on the other (Man: whence, how and whither included), gave specific evidence bearing on the claims of perversion of the original theories by those whom they call Neo-Theosophists." (Note: Thomas stated, "Many, many have doubtless been turned away from genuine Theosophy after being exposed to the obvious gibberish of 'Leadbeaterism' and not being aware of the difference.")

John Prentice in an article Clairvoyant Research criticized the book of the authors. He proclaimed that the material for the Peruvian lives in Man: whence, how and whither (Ch. XI) had been lifted out of Garcilaso de la Vega's Royal Commentaries on the Yuccas of Peru (written in 1609 and published in English translation in 1638, 1869 and 1871).

Joseph Fussell wrote about "abnormal and preposterous claims" published by Besant and Leadbeater.

Helena Roerich stated that Leadbeater's books are a mix of "false and ugly" statements and some fragments of truth: one of the Great Masters supposedly called the book Man: Whence, How and Whither as "a work which devoid of knowledge, honesty and beauty." She wrote: "The book by Besant and Leadbeater is particularly awful, therein is described the lives supposedly the Great Masters and some their pupils, namely: Besant, Leadbeater... I've never seen anything equal to this tasteless blasphemy and falsehood."

Professor Olav Hammer stated that Leadbeater's claims about past lives "were increasingly used to buttress power struggles." He wrote, "Those who supported the controversial Leadbeater were recorded as having had important roles in the past, while his opponents were depicted as villains." In his thesis Hammer wrote:

"How can Leadbeater's readers know that his clairvoyant results really are 'records' and 'information', rather than delusions or deliberate fabrications? His response is feeble, 'there is no assurance. The investigators themselves are certain <...> of the difference between observation and imagination'."

Alice Bailey stated that the book published at Adyar by Besant and Leadbeater was "psychic in his implications and impossible of verification". In her Unfinished Autobiography she wrote that it proved to her the "untrustworthiness" of Leadbeater's writings:

"Books were being published at Adyar by Mr. Leadbeater that were psychic in their implications and impossible of verification, carrying a strong note of astralism. One of his major works, Man: Whence, How and Whither, was a book that proved to me the basic untrustworthiness of what he wrote. It is a book that outlines the future and the work of the Hierarchy of the future, and the curious and arresting thing to me was that the majority of the people slated to hold high office in the Hierarchy and in the future coming civilisation were all Mr. Leadbeater's personal friends. I knew some of these people—worthy, kind, and mediocre, none of them intellectual giants and most of them completely unimportant."

== Publications ==
- Man: Whence, How and Whither. Adyar: Theosophical Publishing House. 1913. OCLC 871602.
- Man: Whence, How and Whither (3rd ed.). Adyar: Theosophical Publishing House. 1954 [1913]. OCLC 600704822.
- Man: Whence, How and Whither (5th reprint, slightly abridged ed.). Adyar: Theosophical Publishing House. 1971 [1913]. OCLC 730293084.
- Man: Whence, How and Whither (Online ed.). Altenmünster Jazzybee Verlag. 2013 [1913]. ISBN 9783849641832. OCLC 867192162.

== See also ==
- Clairvoyance
- Esoteric Buddhism
- How Theosophy Came to Me
- The Rosicrucian Cosmo-Conception
- The Secret Doctrine
- Thought-Forms
- Theosophy and science
