= Charles Webster Leadbeater =

British Theosophist and writer (1854–1934)

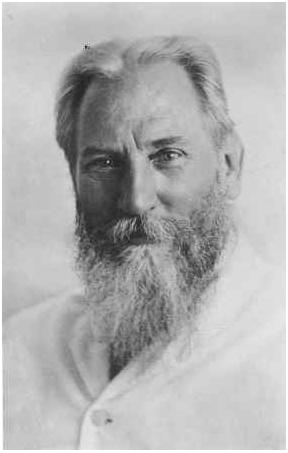
- Leadbeater in 1914 (age 60)
- Born: 16 February 1854; Stockport, Cheshire, England
- Died: 1 March 1934 (aged 80); Perth, Australia
- Occupations: Theosophist and writer
- Notable work: With Annie Besant: Thought-Forms, Occult Chemistry, Man: Whence, How and Whither, a Record of Clairvoyant Investigation

Charles Webster Leadbeater (/ˈlɛdˌbɛtər/; 16 February 1854 – 1 March 1934) was a member of the Theosophical Society, Co-Freemasonry, an author on occult subjects, and the co-initiator, with J. I. Wedgwood, of the Liberal Catholic Church.

Originally a priest of the Church of England, his interest in spiritualism caused him to end his affiliation with Anglicanism in favour of the Theosophical Society, where he became an associate of Annie Besant. He became a high-ranking officer of the Society and remained one of its leading members until his death in 1934, writing over 60 books and pamphlets and maintaining regular speaking engagements.

== Early life ==
Leadbeater was born in Stockport, Cheshire, in 1854. His father, Charles, was born in Lincoln and his mother Emma was born in Liverpool. He was an only child. By 1861, the family had relocated to London, where his father was a railway contractor's clerk.

In 1862, when Leadbeater was eight years old, his father died from tuberculosis. Four years later a bank in which the family's savings were invested became bankrupt. Soon after leaving school Leadbeater sought work in order to provide for his mother and himself. He worked at various clerical jobs. During the evenings he became largely self-educated. For example, he studied astronomy and had a 12-inch reflector telescope (which was very expensive at the time) to observe the heavens at night. He also studied French, Latin and Greek.

An uncle, his father's brother-in-law, was the well-known Anglican cleric William Wolfe Capes. By his uncle's influence, Leadbeater was ordained an Anglican priest in 1879 in Farnham by the Bishop of Winchester. By 1881, he was living with his widowed mother at Bramshott in a cottage which his uncle had built, where he is listed as "Curate of Bramshott". He was an active priest and teacher who was remembered later as "a bright and cheerful and kindhearted man". About this time, after reading about the séances of reputed medium Daniel Dunglas Home (1833–1886), Leadbeater developed an active interest in spiritualism.

== Theosophical Society ==
His interest in Theosophy was stimulated by A. P. Sinnett's Occult World, and he joined the Theosophical Society in 1883. The next year he met Helena Petrovna Blavatsky when she came to London; she accepted him as a pupil and he became a vegetarian.

Around this time he wrote a letter to Kuthumi, asking to be accepted as his pupil. Shortly afterward, an encouraging response influenced him to go to India; he arrived at Adyar in 1884. He wrote that while in India, he had received visits and training from some of the "Masters" that according to Blavatsky were the inspiration behind the formation of the Theosophical Society, and were its hidden guides. This was the start of a long career with the Theosophical Society.

== Headmaster in Ceylon ==
During 1885, Leadbeater traveled with Henry Steel Olcott (1832–1907), first President of the Theosophical Society, to Burma and Ceylon (now Sri Lanka). In Ceylon they founded the English Buddhist Academy, with Leadbeater staying there to serve as its first headmaster under very austere conditions. This school gradually expanded to become Ananda College, which now has more than 6,000 students and has a building named for Leadbeater. After Blavatsky left Adyar in 1886 to return to Europe and finish writing The Secret Doctrine, Leadbeater claimed to have developed clairvoyant abilities.

== Return to England ==
In 1889, Sinnett asked Leadbeater to return to England to tutor his son and George Arundale (1878–1945). He agreed and brought with him one of his pupils, Curuppumullage Jinarajadasa (1875–1953). Although struggling with poverty himself, Leadbeater managed to send both Arundale and Jinarajadasa to Cambridge University. Both would eventually serve as International presidents of the Theosophical Society.

== Meeting with Annie Besant ==
After H. P. Blavatsky's death in 1891, Annie Besant, an English social activist, took over leadership of the Theosophical Society along with Colonel Olcott. Besant met Leadbeater in 1894. The next year she invited him to live at the London Theosophical Headquarters, where H.P. Blavatsky died in 1891.

== Writing and speaking career ==
Leadbeater wrote over 60 books and pamphlets during the period from 1895 to his death in 1934, many of which continued to be published until 1955. Two noteworthy titles, Astral Plane and the Devachanic Plane (or The Heaven World) both of which contained writings on the realms the soul passes through after death.

"For the first time among occultists, a detailed investigation had been made of the Astral Plane as a whole, in a manner similar to that in which a botanist in an Amazonian jungle would set to work in order to classify its trees, plants and shrubs, and so write a botanical history of the jungle. For this reason the little book, The Astral Plane, was definitely a landmark, and the Master as Keeper of the Records desired to place its manuscript in the great Museum."

Highlights of his writing career included addressing topics such as: the existence of a loving God, The Masters of Wisdom, what happens after death, immortality of the human soul, reincarnation, Karma or the Law of Consequence, development of clairvoyant abilities, the nature of thought forms, dreams, vegetarianism, Esoteric Christianity

He also became one of the best known speakers of the Theosophical Society for a number of years and served as Secretary of the London Lodge.

=== Clairvoyance ===
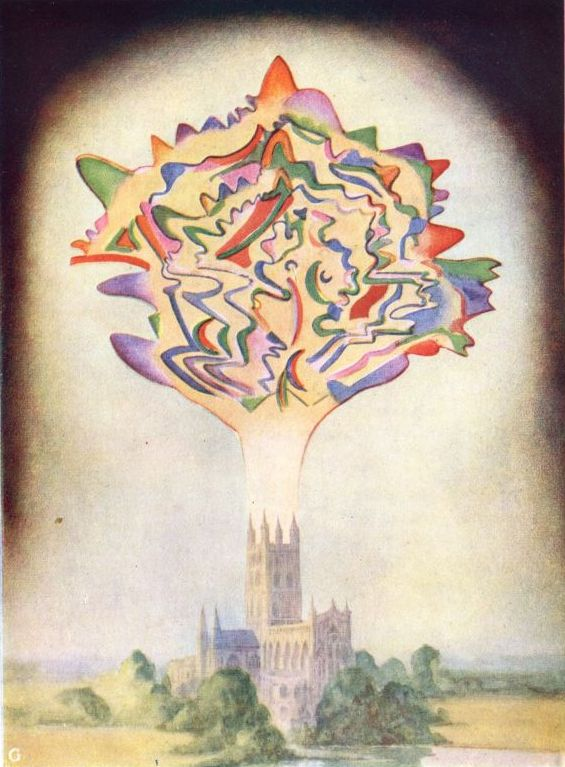
"Seeing" of music: a piece by Gounod (from a book Thought-Forms by Annie Besant and C. W. Leadbeater).

Clairvoyance is a book by Leadbeater originally published in 1899 in London. It is a study of a belief in seeing beyond the realms of ordinary sight. The author mainly appeals to readers "convinced of the existence of clairvoyance and familiar with theosophical terms." Leadbeater claims that the "power to see what is hidden from ordinary physical sight" is an extension of common perception, and "describes a wide range of phenomena." (Note: When the Theosophical Society was created the investigation "the unexplained laws of nature and the powers latent in man" was proclaimed its third major task.) (Note: Professor Robert Ellwood stated, "The key to Leadbeater's teaching and theosophical style is the idea of clairvoyance, the capacity to see things that are hidden from ordinary eyes.")

=== Methods of development ===
Leadbeater writes about the importance of control over thinking and the need for skill "to concentrate thought":

"Let a man choose a certain time every day—a time when he can rely upon being quiet and undisturbed, though preferably in the daytime rather than at night—and set himself at that time to keep his mind for a few minutes entirely free from all earthly thoughts of any kind whatever and, when that is achieved, to direct the whole force of his being towards the highest spiritual ideal that he happens to know. He will find that to gain such perfect control of thought is enormously more difficult than he supposes, but when he attains it, it cannot but be in every way most beneficial to him, and as he grows more and more able to elevate and concentrate his thought, he may gradually find that new worlds are opening before his sight." (Note: "He (Leadbeater) suggests that if the aspirant should concentrate on living the pure and unselfish life and practice meditation, then possibly some form of psychic power may emerge spontaneously with little risk.") (Note: Professor Radhakrishnan wrote: "By following the principles of the Yoga, such as heightening the power of concentration, arresting the vagaries of mind by fixing one's attention on the deepest sources of strength, one can master one's soul even as an athlete masters his body. The Yoga helps us to reach a higher level of consciousness, through a transformation of the psychic organism, which enables it to get beyond the limits set to ordinary human experience." Uncommon power of the senses, by which man "can see and hear at a distance, follow as a result of concentration." According to Buddhist philosophy, extra-sensory abilities achieved primarily "through meditation and wisdom.")

=== Author's personal experience ===
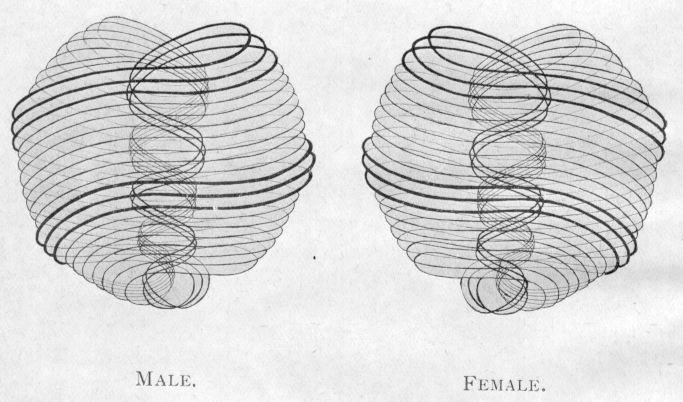
"Ultramicroscopic seeing" of matter: the "ultimate" physical atom (from Occult Chemistry by A. Besant and C. W. Leadbeater).

Professor Robert Ellwood wrote that from 1884 to 1888 Leadbeater undertook a course of meditation practice "which awakened his clairvoyance." One day when the Master Kuthumi visited, he asked whether Leadbeater had ever attempted "a certain kind of meditation connected with the development of the mysterious power called kundalini." The Master recommended him to make a "few efforts along certain lines," and told him that he would himself "watch over those efforts to see that no danger should ensue." Leadbeater accepted the offer of the Master and became "day after day" working on this kind of meditation. He worked on the task assigned to him for forty-two days, and it seemed to him that he was already on the verge of achieving a result when Kuthumi intervened and "performed the final act of breaking through which completed the process," and enabled Leadbeater thereafter to use astral sight while retaining full consciousness in the physical body. It is equivalent to saying that "the astral consciousness and memory became continuous, "whether the physical body was awake or asleep". (Note: "The awakening of the kundalini arouses an intense heat, and its progress through the cakras is manifested by the lower part of the body becoming as inert and cold as a corpse, while the part—through which the kundalini passes—is burning hot." Professor Olav Hammer wrote that in the most authoritative interpretation chakras were introduced to the Western audience by the Theosophists, mainly by Leadbeater.)

=== Possible application ===
In the chapter "Simple Clairvoyance: Full" the author argues that an occultist-clairvoyant can "see" the smallest particles of matter, for example, a molecule or atom, magnifying them "as though by a microscope." (Note: "The power of 'magnification' is said to be one of the powers, or siddhis, of the great yogi, meaning that he is able to look at small objects and see them greatly enlarged.") (Note: "Leadbeater had first used his psychic powers in delving in to the atom at the request of Mr. Sinnett, and thus discovered that he possessed 'ultramicroscopic' vision.") In the chapter "Clairvoyance in Time: The Past" Leadbeater claims that the historian who is in "full possession of this power" can open up wonderful possibilities:

"He has before him a field of historical research of most entrancing interest. Not only can he review at his leisure all history with which we are acquainted, correcting as he examines it the many errors and misconceptions which have crept into the accounts handed down to us; he can also range at will over the whole story of the world from its very beginning." (Note: "Through concentration on the threefold modifications which all objects constantly undergo, we acquire the power to know the past, present and the future.") (Note: See also: Man: Whence, How and Whither#Explorations of past lives)

=== New editions and translations ===
The book was reprinted several times and translated into some European languages. Second edition of the book was published in 1903, and third—in 1908. (Note: "19 editions published between 1899 and 2014 in 5 languages and held by 23 WorldCat member libraries worldwide.")

== Resignation from the Theosophical Society ==
In 1906, critics were angered to learn that Leadbeater had given advice to boys under his care that encouraged masturbation as a way to relieve obsessive sexual thoughts. Leadbeater acknowledged that he had given this advice to a few boys approaching maturity who came to him for help. He commented, "I know that the whole question of sex feelings is the principal difficulty in the path of boys and girls, and very much harm is done by the prevalent habit of ignoring the subject and fearing to speak of it to young people. The first information about it should come from parents or friends, not from servants or bad companions."

The revelations regarding Leadbeater's advice prompted several members of the Theosophical Society to ask for his resignation. The Society held proceedings against him in 1906. Annie Besant, elected president of the Society in 1907, later stated in his defence:

"The so-called trial of Mr Leadbeater was a travesty of justice. He came before Judges, one of whom had declared before hand that 'he ought to be shot'; another, before hearing him, had written passionate denunciations of him, a third and fourth had accepted, on purely psychic testimony, unsupported by any evidence, the view that he was grossly immoral, and a danger to the Society..."

Charges of misconduct that went beyond the advice he admitted giving were never proven. He nevertheless resigned.

== Readmission to the Theosophical Society ==
After Olcott died in 1907, Annie Besant became president of the society following a political struggle. By the end of 1908, the International Sections voted for Leadbeater's readmission. He accepted and came to Adyar on 10 February 1909. At the time, Besant referred to Leadbeater as a martyr who was wronged by her and by the Theosophical Society, saying that "never again would a shadow come between her and her brother Initiate".

== Discovery of Krishnamurti ==
In 1909 Leadbeater encountered fourteen-year-old Jiddu Krishnamurti at the private beach of the Theosophical Society headquarters at Adyar. Krishnamurti's family lived next to the compound; his father, a long-time Theosophist, was employed by the Society. Leadbeater believed Krishnamurti to be a suitable candidate for the "vehicle" of the World Teacher, a reputed messianic entity whose imminent appearance he and many Theosophists were expecting. The proclaimed saviour would then usher in a new age and religion.

Leadbeater assigned the pseudonym Alcyone to Krishnamurti and under the title "Rents in the Veil of Time", he published 30 reputed past lives of Alcyone in a series in The Theosophist magazine beginning in April 1910. "They ranged from 22,662 BC to 624 AD ... Alcyone was a female in eleven of them."

Leadbeater stayed in India until 1915, overseeing the education of Krishnamurti; he then relocated to Australia. During the late 1920s, Krishnamurti disavowed the role that Leadbeater and other Theosophists expected him to fulfil. He disassociated himself from the Theosophical Society and its doctrines and practices, and during the next six decades became known as an influential speaker on philosophical and religious subjects.

== Australia and The Science of the Sacraments ==
In 1915 Leadbeater moved to Sydney, where he laid the foundation-stone (Note: In 1922 his name was erased from the foundation-stone, a move perhaps unequalled in the history of Sydney.) of the Theosophical Hall, "King's Hall" on Hunter Street. He was responsible for the construction of the Star Amphitheatre at Balmoral Beach in 1924. While in Australia he became acquainted with J. I. Wedgwood, a Theosophist and bishop in the Liberal Catholic Church who initiated him into Co-Masonry in 1915 and later consecrated him as a bishop of the Liberal Catholic Church in 1916.

Public interest in Theosophy in Australia and New Zealand increased greatly as a result of Leadbeater's presence there and Sydney became comparable to Adyar as a centre of Theosophical activity.

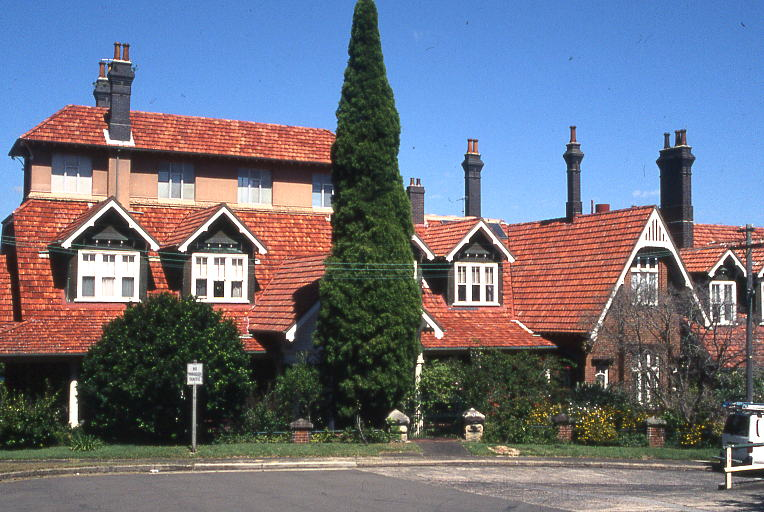
The Manor, Sydney, Australia, where Leadbeater stayed from 1922 to 1929

In 1922, the Theosophical Society began renting a mansion known as The Manor in the Sydney suburb of Mosman. Leadbeater took up residence there as the director of a community of Theosophists. The Manor became a major site and was regarded as "the greatest of occult forcing houses". There he accepted young women students. They included Clara Codd, future President of the Theosophical Society in America, clairvoyant Dora van Gelder, another future President of the Theosophical Society in America who during the 1970s also worked with Delores Krieger to develop the technique of Therapeutic touch, and Mary Lutyens, who would later write an authorized Krishnamurti biography. Lutyens stayed there in 1925, while Krishnamurti and his brother Nitya stayed at another house nearby. The Manor became one of three major Theosophical Society sites, the others being at Adyar and the Netherlands. The Theosophical Society bought The Manor in 1925 and during 1951 created The Manor Foundation Ltd, to own and administer the house, which is still used by the Society.

It was also during his stay in Australia that Leadbeater became the Presiding Bishop of the Liberal Catholic Church and co-wrote the liturgy book for the church which is still in use today. The work represents an adaptation of the Roman Catholic liturgy of his time, for which Leadbeater sought to remove what he regarded as undesirable elements, such as (in his view) the blatant anthropomorphisms and expressions of the fear and wrath of God, which he regarded "as derogatory alike to the idea of a loving Father and to the men He has created in His own image."

"If Christians", he wrote, "had been content to take what Christ taught of the Father in heaven, they would never have saddled themselves with the jealous, angry, bloodthirsty Jehovah of Ezra, Nehemiah and the others – a god that needs propitiating and to whose 'mercy' constant appeals must be made."

Thus the Credo of the Liberal Catholic Church liturgy for the shorter form of Holy Eucharist written by Leadbeater reads:

"We believe that God is Love, and Power, and Truth, and Light; that perfect justice rules the world: that all His sons shall one day reach His Feet, however far they stray. We hold the Fatherhood of God, the Brotherhood of man; we know that we do serve Him best when best we serve our brother man. So shall His blessing rest on us, + and peace for evermore. Amen."

Previously, Leadbeater had written on the energies of the Christian sacraments in The Science of the Sacraments: An Occult and Clairvoyant Study of the Christian Eucharist, one of the most significant works of Christian esotericism. In his prologue to the latest edition of this book, John Kersey refers to the Eucharist proposed by Leadbeater as "a radical reinterpretation of the context of the Eucharist seen within a theological standpoint of esoteric magic and universal salvation; it is Catholicism expressing the love of God to the full without the burdens of needless guilt and fear, and the false totem of the temporal powers of the church."

== How Theosophy Came to Me ==
How Theosophy Came to Me is an autobiographical book by Leadbeater, first published in 1930. wherein Leadbeater writes that he was interested always in a variety of anomalous phenomena, and if in any newspaper report there was mention of the appearance of ghosts or other curious events in a troubled house, he had immediately gone to this location. In a large number of instances it was a blank — "either there was no evidence worth mentioning, or the ghost declined to appear when he was wanted." Sometimes, however, there were signs of some success, and soon he had collected "an amount of direct evidence" that could easily convince him.

In his attitude to spiritualism Leadbeater was initially quite sceptical, but still one day decided to conduct an experiment with his mother and a small boy, who, as they later discovered, "was a powerful physical medium." They had a small round table with a leg in the middle and silk hat, which they put on the table, and then put their "hands upon its brim as prescribed." Surprisingly the hat gave "a gentle but decided half-turn on the polished surface of the table," and then began to spin so vigorously that it was difficult to keep their hands on it.
Further, the author describes the events as follows:

"Here was my own familiar silk hat, which I had never before suspected of any occult qualities, suspending itself mysteriously in the air from the tips of our fingers, and, not content with that defiance of the laws of gravity on its own account, attaching a table to its crown and lifting that also! I looked down to the feet of the table; they were about six inches from the carpet, and no human foot was touching them or near them! I passed my own foot underneath, but there was certainly nothing there—nothing physically perceptible, at any rate."

The author says that he was not himself thinking of the phenomenon "in the least as a manifestation from the dead," but only as the disclosure of some unknown new force. (Note: Tillett stated: "Leadbeater's interest in spiritualism increased after the death of his mother on May 24, 1882." Also Matley wrote that Leadbeater had been on a "few spiritualistic séances" of the mediums Husk and Eglinton.)

Leadbeater says that the first theosophical book that fell into his hands was Sinnett's The Occult World. Histories contained in this book were for him very interesting, but "its real fascination lay in the glimpses which it gave of a wonderful system of philosophy and of a kind of inner science which really seemed to explain life rationally and to account for many phenomena," which Leadbeater had himself seen. He had written to Sinnett, who invited him to come to London in order to meet. (Note: His new life had started in 1883, when he had read Sinnett's The Occult World. It had led the "young curate" to contact with the Theosophical Society in London.) The author tells that when he had asked to join the Society, Sinnett "became very grave and opined that that would hardly do," since Leadbeater was a clergyman. He had asked him why the Society discriminates against members according to the cloth. Sinnett replied: "Well, you see, we are in the habit of discussing every subject and every belief from the beginning, without any preconceptions whatever; and I am afraid that at our meetings you would be likely to hear a great deal that would shock you profoundly." But most members of the Council of the London Lodge approved the admission of Leadbeater. He was admitted into the Theosophical Society together with professor Crookes and his wife. On that day at the Lodge meeting there were "some two hundred people present," including such as professor Myers, Stainton Moses and others. (Note: Leadbeater "was welcomed into the London Lodge on February 21, 1884.")

Blavatsky

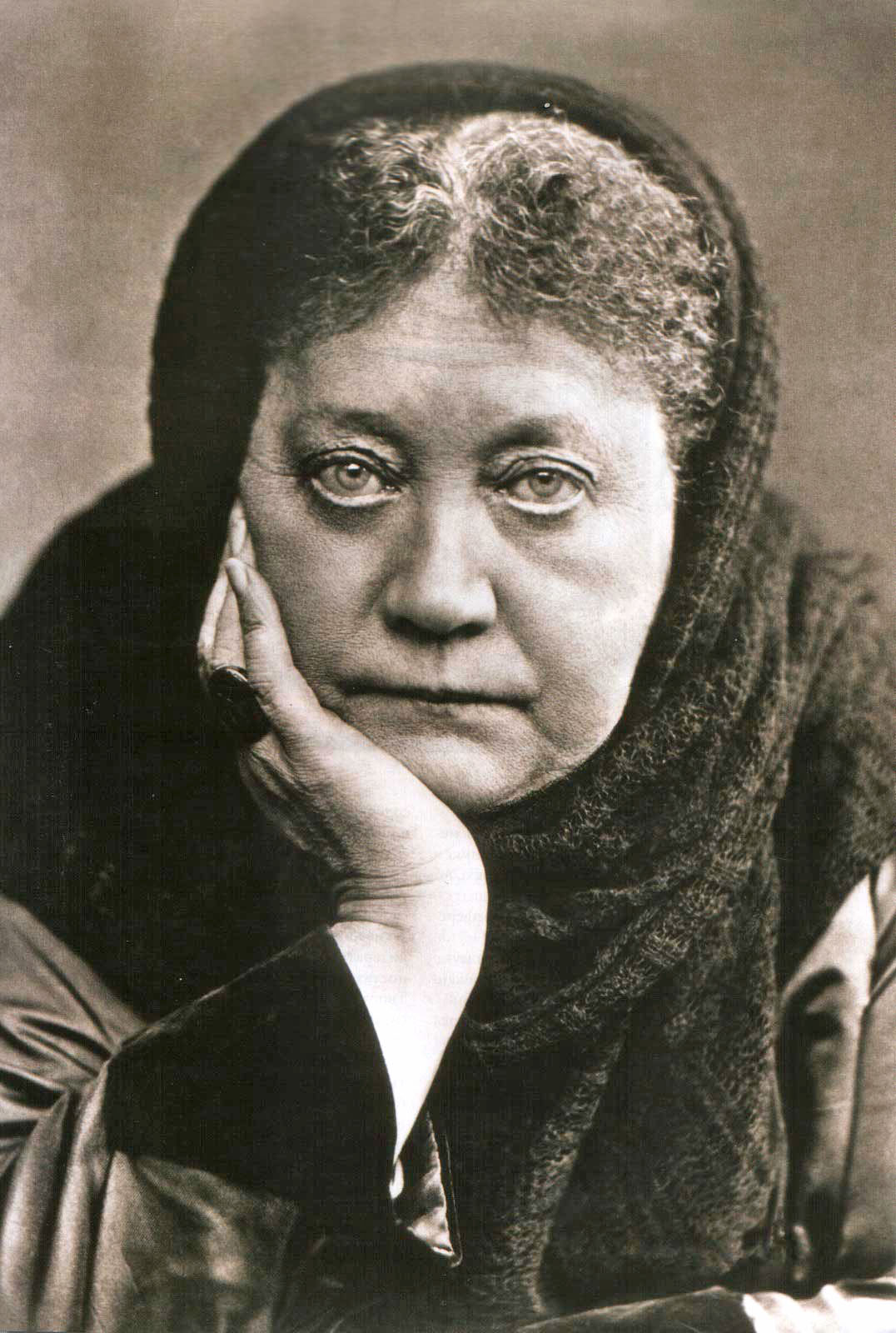
Blavatsky

In a section I Meet Our Founder Leadbeater describes the "triumphant" appearance of Helena Blavatsky at a meeting of the London Lodge of the British Theosophical Society, where he saw her for the first time. (Note: Senkevich wrote: "The appearance of Blavatsky at the meeting was triumphant, some of its participants fell down in front of her to their knees.... At this re-election meeting she was deservedly represented by the queen of occultism, all were obeying her will unquestioningly.")

"Suddenly and sharply the door opposite to us opened, and a stout lady in black came quickly in and seated herself at the outer end of our bench. She sat listening to the wrangling on the platform for a few minutes, and then began to exhibit distinct signs of impatience. As there seemed to be no improvement in sight, she then jumped up from her seat, shouted in a tone of military command the one word 'Mohini!' (Note: Mohini Mohun Chatterji (1858–1936) was a private secretary to Henry Steel Olcott.) and then walked straight out of the door into the passage. The stately and dignified Mohini came rushing down that long room at his highest speed, and as soon as he reached the passage threw himself incontinently flat on his face on the floor at the feet of the lady in black. Many people arose in confusion, not knowing what was happening; but a moment later Mr. Sinnett himself also came running to the door, went out and exchanged a few words, and then, re-entering the room, he stood up on the end of our bench and spoke in a ringing voice the fateful words: 'Let me introduce to the London Lodge as a whole—Madame Blavatsky!' The scene was indescribable; the members, wildly delighted and yet half-awed at the same time, clustered round our great Founder, some kissing her hand, several kneeling before her, and two or three weeping hysterically." (Note: "Then, on April 7, 1884, Leadbeater met Helena Petrovna Blavatsky and Henry Steel Olcott at a turbulent election meeting of the London Lodge. Deeply impressed by Blavatsky, from that day on Leadbeater's commitment tilted more and more away from Anglicanism and toward theosophy.")

According to the author, the impression which Blavatsky made "was indescribable". She would look straight through a man, and obviously saw everything that was in one, and not everyone liked it. Sometimes Leadbeater heard from her very unpleasant revelations about those with whom she spoke. He writes: "Prodigious force was the first impression, and perhaps courage, outspokenness, and straightforwardness were the second."

Leadbeater writes that Blavatsky was the best interlocutor he had ever met: "She had the most wonderful gift for repartee; she had it almost to excess, perhaps." She also had knowledge of all sorts of things that related to very different subjects. She always had something to say, and it was never empty talk. She travelled a lot, and mostly in little-known places, and did not forget anything. She remembered even the most insignificant events that had happened to her. She was a wonderful storyteller, who knew how to deliver a good story and make the right impression. "Whatever else she may have been, she was never commonplace. She always had something new, striking, interesting, unusual to tell us."

In connection with the accusations of Blavatsky's enemies regarding her alleged fraud, cheating, and forgery, Leadbeater writes: "The very idea of deception of any sort in connection with Madame Blavatsky is unthinkable to anyone who knew her... Her absolute genuineness was one of the most prominent features of her marvellously complex character."

Letters from Kuthumi

The author tells that during the study of spiritualism his greatest confidant was medium William Eglinton. On one of the spiritualistic séances Eglinton's spirit guide "Ernest" agreed to take Leadbeater's letter in order to transmit it to the Master Kuthumi. In this letter the author "with all reverence" wrote that ever since he had first heard of theosophy his one desire had been to place himself under the Master as a chela (pupil). (Note: Goodrick-Clarke wrote that "the very concept of the Masters" is the Rosicrucian idea of "invisible and secret adepts, working for the advancement of humanity." And Tillett stated: "The concept of Masters or Mahatmas as presented by HPB involved a mixture of western and eastern ideas; she located most of them in India or Tibet. Both she and Colonel Olcott claimed to have seen and to be in communication with Masters. In Western occultism the idea of 'Supermen' has been found in such schools as... the fraternities established by de Pasqually and de Saint-Martin.") He also wrote about his current circumstances and asked whether a pupil needed to be in India for seven years of probation.

The response from the Master Kuthumi arrived a few months later. The mahatma said that to be in India for seven years of probation wasn't necessary—a chela could pass them anywhere. He offered to let Leadbeater work at Adyar for a few months to see if he could be a servant at the headquarters, and added a significant remark: "He who would shorten the years of probation has to make sacrifices for theosophy." (Note: Leadbeater "received a letter from the Master Koot Hoomi (K.H.) in October 31, 1884, just prior to Blavatsky's return to India. Leadbeater responded by writing a letter on November 1 in which he offered to give up his career in the Church and go to India with her to serve theosophy.")
The letter was ended with the following words:

"You ask me — 'what rules I must observe during this time of probation, and how soon I might venture to hope that it could begin'. I answer: you have the making of your own future, in your own hands as shown above, and every day you may be weaving its woof. If I were to demand that you should do one thing or the other, instead of simply advising, I would be responsible for every effect that might flow from the step and you acquire but a secondary merit. Think, and you will see that this is true. So cast the lot yourself into the lap of Justice, never fearing but that its response will be absolutely true.

Chelaship is an educational as well as probationary stage and the chela alone can determine whether it shall end in adeptship or failure. Chelas from a mistaken idea of our system too often watch and wait for orders, wasting precious time which should be taken up with personal effort. Our cause needs missionaries, devotees, agents, even martyrs perhaps. But it cannot demand of any man to make himself either. So now choose and grasp your own destiny, and may our Lord's the Tathâgata's memory aid you to decide for the best."

After reading the letter, Leadbeater hurried back to London, not doubting his decision to devote his life to service for the Masters. He hoped to send his answer with the help of Blavatsky. At first she refused to read the letter of the mahatma, saying that such cases are purely private, but as a result of Leadbeater's insistence, she finally read and asked him what answer he had decided to give. He said he wanted to quit his priesthood career and go to India, fully dedicating himself to serving the Masters. Blavatsky assured him that, because of her constant connection with the mahatma, he already knew about Leadbeater's decision, and would give his answer in the near future. She warned that he needed to stay close to her until he got an answer. (Note: Leadbeater passed the mahatma's letter to Blavatsky in London and asked her to read it, that she did unwillingly, since she believed so it was a confidential correspondence. He "then accompanied her to the home of the Cooper-Oakleys where, 'after midnight' (i.e., early November 2, 1884) a reply materialized on Blavatsky's upturned hand while Leadbeater was watching.") The author tells:

"She (Blavatsky) was talking brilliantly to those who were present, and rolling one of her eternal cigarettes, when suddenly her right hand was jerked out towards the fire in a very peculiar fashion, and lay palm upwards. She looked down at it in surprise, as I did myself, for I was standing close to her, leaning with an elbow on the mantel-piece: and several of us saw quite clearly a sort of whitish mist form in the palm of her hand and then condense into a piece of folded paper, which she at once handed to me, saying: 'There is your answer'."

It was a very short note, and read it as follows:

"Since your intuition led you in the right direction and made you understand that it was my desire you should go to Adyar immediately, I may say more. The sooner you go the better. Do not lose one day more than you can help. Sail on the 5th if possible. Join Upasika (Note: "Upasika is a name often used for H.P.B. in the Letters; the word is from Buddhism, where it denotes a Lay Disciple.") at Alexandria. Let no one know that you are going, and may the blessing of our Lord and my poor blessing shield you from every evil in your new life. Greeting to you, my new chela.
−K.H." (Note: With this note the mahatma ordered Leadbeater to leave England immediately, since it was his desire, and to join Blavatsky in Alexandria. "This he did, precipitously resigning his priesthood, putting his affairs in order, and sailing for India on November 5.")

In the section A Message the author tells how Blavatsky received in the moving train carriage from the mahatma Kuthumi a note, which had several words intended for him: "Tell Leadbeater that I am satisfied with his zeal and devotion."

Leadbeater claims that in the early days of the Theosophical Society commissions and orders from the mahatmas were common, and members lived at a "level of splendid enthusiasm which those who have joined since Madame Blavatsky's death can hardly imagine."

Tisarana and pansil

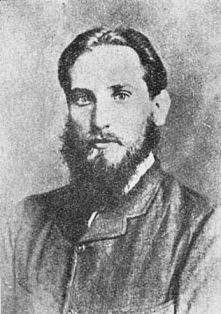
Leadbeater in Adyar, 1885

During the few weeks of travelling from Egypt to India, Blavatsky radically transformed the personality of Leadbeater, who was "an ordinary lawn-tennis-playing curate—well-meaning and conscientious... incredibly shy and retiring," making him a worthy disciple of the mahatmas. (Note: Senkevich wrote: "The last trip of Blavatsky to India was described in memoirs by Charles Leadbeater, who was a young rural Anglican priest that had just joined the Theosophical Society. He had been accompanying Blavatsky from England to Port Said, from there – to Colombo, and then – to Madras.")

During a brief stop in Ceylon, Blavatsky, who together with Olcott had already become a Buddhist, invited Leadbeater to follow the example of the founders of the Theosophical Society. The author writes that she believed that since he was a Christian priest, his public demonstration of Buddhism could convince both Hindus and Buddhists of the honesty of his intentions and would allow him to become more useful for the mahatmas.
After three times pronouncing a praise to the Lord Buddha: "I reverence the Blessed One, the Holy One, the Perfect in Wisdom," Leadbeater recited the Pali sacred formula of the Tisarana and then the Pancha Sila. (Note: Leadbeater "took pansil, formally becoming a Buddhist, in Colombo, Ceylon, and then arrived in Adyar in December 1884.")

Upon arrival in Madras, Blavatsky spoke in front of the Hindustanis who filled the room, indignant at the actions of the Christian missionaries.

"When at last she was allowed to speak, she began very well by saying how touched she was by this enthusiastic reception, and how it showed her what she had always known, that the people of India would not accept tamely these vile, cowardly, loathsome and utterly abominable slanders, circulated by these unspeakable—but here she became so vigorously adjectival that the Colonel hurriedly intervened, and somehow persuaded her to resume her seat, while he called upon an Indian member to offer a few remarks." (Note: "As soon as the audience was quiet, Blavatsky began her fierce speech directed against Christian missionaries. In it, she used such an obscene word that Olcott jumped up in terror and looked pleadingly at her.")

The author tells that his life at Adyar was ascetic; there were practically no servants, except two gardeners and a boy who had been working in the office. Every day Leadbeater ate porridge made from wheat flakes, which he prepared himself, also he was being brought milk and bananas. At the headquarters of the Society, Leadbeater had been taking the position of the recording secretary, since that allowed him to remain in the centre of the Theosophical movement, where, as he knew, in their materialized forms, the Masters often showed themselves. (Note: "From 1884 to 1888, Leadbeater was recording secretary of the Theosophical Society, assistant to Olcott and a student of the Ancient Wisdom called theosophy.")

One day the author met with the mahatma Kuthumi on the roof of the headquarters, next to Blavatsky's room. He was near a balustrade which was "running along the front of the house at the edge of the roof" when the Master "materialized", stepping over the balustrade, as if before that he had been flying through the air. Leadbeater says:

"Naturally I rushed forward and prostrated myself before Him; He raised me with a kindly smile, saying that though such demonstrations of reverence were the custom among the Indian peoples, He did not expect them from His European devotees, and He thought that perhaps there would be less possibility of any feeling of embarrassment if each nation confined itself to its own methods of salutation."

Occult training

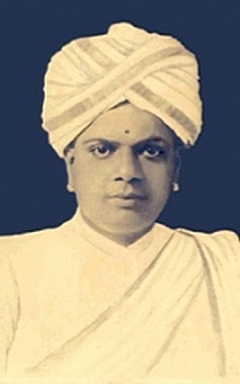
Subba Row

The author claims that when he arrived in India, he did not have any clairvoyant abilities. One day when Kuthumi "honoured" him with a visit, he asked whether Leadbeater had ever attempted "a certain kind of meditation connected with the development of the mysterious power called kundalini." (Note: "Leadbeater and later Esotericists up to and including New Age writers have reinterpreted kundalini as simply a form of energy.") Leadbeater had heard of that power, but thought it to be certainly out of reach for Western people. Yet Kuthumi recommended him to make a "few efforts along certain lines," and told him that he would himself "watch over those efforts to see that no danger should ensue." He accepted the offer of the Master and spent "day after day" working on this kind of meditation. He was told that typically it would take forty days, if he did it constantly and vigorously.

Leadbeater worked on the task assigned to him for forty-two days, and it seemed to him that he was already on the verge of achieving a result when Kuthumi intervened and "performed the final act of breaking through which completed the process," and enabled the author thereafter to use astral sight while he was still retaining full consciousness in the physical body. It is equivalent to saying that "the astral consciousness and memory became continuous," whether the physical body was awake or asleep. (Note: Robert Ellwood wrote that from 1884 to 1888 Leadbeater had a course of meditation practice "which awakened his clairvoyance.")

A lot of care and work was spent on occult training of the author by the Master Djwal Khul. Leadbeater tells:

"Over and over again He would make a vivid thought-form, and say to me: 'What do you see?' And when I described it to the best of my ability, would come again and again the comment: 'No, no, you are not seeing true; you are not seeing all; dig deeper into yourself, use your mental vision as well as your astral; press just a little further, a little higher.'"

To participate in the training of Leadbeater, swami Subba Row, "our great pandit", as the author calls him, often came to the headquarters. And Leadbeater claims that he will forever remain in obligation to these "two great people" — Djwal Khul and Subba Row – for all the help which they gave him "at this critical stage" of his life.

== Allegations of pederasty ==
Mary Lutyens in "Krishnamurti: The Years of Awakening" writes:

"Then in 1906, after Leadbeater's return to England, the fourteen-year-old son of the Corresponding Secretary of the Esoteric Section in Chicago, whom Leadbeater had taken with him to San Francisco on his first lecture tour, confessed to his parents the reason for the antipathy he had conceived for his mentor, to whom he had at first been greatly devoted—Leadbeater had encouraged him in the habit of masturbation. Almost simultaneously the son of another Theosophical official in Chicago charged Leadbeater with the same offense without apparently there being any collusion between the two boys. Then a typewritten, unsigned, undated, cipher-letter was produced; it had been picked up by a suspicious cleaner on the floor of a flat in Toronto in which Leadbeater had stayed with the second boy and was said to have been written by Leadbeater. The code was simple and when broken revealed one passage of such obscenity, for those days, that the letter could not by law be printed in England. When decoded the offending passage read: "Glad sensation is so pleasant. Thousand kisses darling."

A commission was appointed by the American Section, but before the meeting, Leadbeater resigned the TS, as he told Olcott, "to save the Society from embarrassment."

On the nature of the accusation itself, Leadbeater wrote to Annie Besant:

"So when boys came under my care, I mentioned this matter to them [masturbation], among other things, always trying to avoid all sorts of false shame, and to make the whole appear as natural and simple as possible...".

Another such accusation came later from Hubert van Hook of Chicago, who as an 11-year-old was proclaimed by Leadbeater as future World Teacher. On the denunciation, Mary Lutyens states: "Hubert later swore to Mrs Besant that Leadbeater had 'misused' him, but as he was extremely vindictive by that time, his testimony, though unshaken, was perhaps not altogether reliable.'

However one of the more suggestive eye-witness accounts was from Mary Lutyens, not an enemy of Leadbeater:

"Leadbeater 'came prancing down the wharf like a great lion,' as Mary described it, 'hatless and in a long purple cloak, holding on to the arm of a very good-looking blond boy of about fifteen. This was Theodore St John, an Australian boy of great charm and sweetness, who was Leadbeater's current favourite and who slept in his room."

== Selected writings ==
- Dreams (What they are and how they are caused) (1893)
- Theosophical Manual Nº5: The Astral Plane (Its Scenery, Inhabitants and Phenomena) (1896)
- Theosophical Manual Nº6: The Devachanic Plane or The Heaven World Its Characteristics and Inhabitants (1896)
- Invisible Helpers (1896)
- Reincarnation (1898)
- Our Relation to Our Children (1898)
- Clairvoyance (1899)
- An Outline of Theosophy (1902)
- Man Visible and Invisible (1902)
- Some Glimpses of Occultism, Ancient and Modern (1903)
- The Christian Creed (1904)
- Thought Forms (with Annie Besant) (1905)
- Occult Chemistry (with Annie Besant) (1908)
- The Inner Life (1911)
- The Perfume of Egypt and Other Weird Stories (1911)
- The Power and Use of Thought (1911)
- The Life After Death and How Theosophy Unveils It (1912)
- A Textbook of Theosophy (1912)
- Man: Whence, How and Whither (with Annie Besant) (1913)
- Vegetarianism and Occultism (1913)
- The Hidden Side of Things (1913)
- Australia & New Zealand: Home of a new sub-race (1916)
- The Monad and Other Essays Upon the Higher Consciousness (1920)
- The Inner Side of Christian Festivals (1920)
- The Science of the Sacraments (1920)
- The Lives of Alcyone (with Annie Besant) (1924)
- The Liturgy According to the Use of the Liberal Catholic Church (with J.I. Wedgwood) (Second Edition) (1924)
- The Masters and the Path (1925)
- Talks on the Path of Occultism (1926)
- Glimpses of Masonic History (1926) (later pub 1986 as Ancient Mystic Rites)
- The Hidden Life in Freemasonry (1926)
- The Chakras (1927) (published by the Theosophical Publishing House, Wheaton, Illinois, USA)
- Spiritualism and Theosophy Scientifically Examined and Carefully Described (1928)
- The Noble Eightfold Path (1955)
- Messages from the Unseen (1931)

== See also ==
- Chakras
- Clairvoyance
- Christian mythology
- K. H. Letters to C. W. Leadbeater
- Reincarnation
- Root race
- Theosophy and Christianity
- Theosophy and visual arts

== Sources ==
- "Abhijna". Encyclopædia Britannica Online. Encyclopædia Britannica Inc. 2005.
- "Clairvoyance". Encyclopædia Britannica Online. Encyclopædia Britannica Inc. 2005.
- Formats and Editions of Clairvoyance. OCLC WorldCat. OCLC 2622915.
- Formats and editions of How theosophy came to me. OCLC WorldCat. OCLC 8659701.
- Clairvoyance (monograph). OCLC WorldCat. OCLC 906603421.
- Leadbeater, Charles Webster (2016). Clairvoyance by Charles Webster Leadbeater. Cambridge University Press. doi:10.1017/CBO9780511974700. ISBN 9780511974700 – via Cambridge Books Online.
- "Leadbeater, Charles Webster 1854–1934". WorldCat Identities. OCLC WorldCat.
- Melton, J. G., ed. (2001c). "Clairvoyance". Encyclopedia of Occultism and Parapsychology. Vol. 1 (5th ed.). Gale Group. pp. 297–301. ISBN 0-8103-8570-8.
- Melton, J. G., ed. (2001). "Husk, Cecil (1847–1920)". Encyclopedia of Occultism and Parapsychology. Vol. 1 (5th ed.). Gale Group. pp. 757–58. ISBN 0-8103-8570-8.
- Melton, J. G., ed. (2001a). "Kundalini". Encyclopedia of Occultism and Parapsychology. Vol. 1 (5th ed.). Gale Group. pp. 881–83. ISBN 0-8103-8570-8.
- Melton, J. G., ed. (2001b). "Levitation". Encyclopedia of Occultism and Parapsychology. Vol. 1 (5th ed.). Gale Group. pp. 909–18. ISBN 0-8103-8570-8.
- Shepard, L., ed. (1991). "Clairvoyance". Encyclopedia of Occultism & Parapsychology. Vol. 1 (3rd ed.). Detroit: Gale Research Inc. pp. 292–94. ISBN 0810349159.
- Eliade, M. (1958). Yoga: Immortality and Freedom. Translated by Trask, W. R. Princeton University Press. ISBN 9780691017648.
- Ellwood, R. S. (15 March 2012). "Leadbeater, Charles Webster". Theosopedia. Manila: Theosophical Publishing House.
- Goodrick-Clarke, N. (2004). Helena Blavatsky. Western esoteric masters. Berkeley: North Atlantic Books. ISBN 1-55643-457-X.
- Hammer, O. (2003). Claiming Knowledge: Strategies of Epistemology from Theosophy to the New Age. Studies in the history of religions. Boston: Brill. ISBN 9789004136380.
- Harris, P. S. (5 December 2011). "Clairvoyance". Theosopedia. Manila: Theosophical Publishing House.
- Jinarajadasa, C., ed. (1919). Letters from the masters of the wisdom, 1881–1888. Adyar: Theosophical Publishing House. OCLC 5151989. OL 22885043M.
- Jinarajadasa, C. (2013) [1941]. The K. H. Letters to C. W. Leadbeater. Literary Licensing, LLC. ISBN 9781258882549.
- Kuhn, A. B. (1992) [1930]. Theosophy: A Modern Revival of Ancient Wisdom (PhD thesis). American religion series: Studies in religion and culture. Whitefish, MT: Kessinger Publishing. ISBN 978-1-56459-175-3.
- Leadbeater, C. W. (1899). Clairvoyance. London: Theosophical Publishing Society.
- Leadbeater, C. W. (1930). How Theosophy Came to Me. Adyar: Theosophical Pub. House. OCLC 561055008.
- ———— (1967) [1930]. How Theosophy Came to Me (3rd ed.). Madras: Theosophical Pub. House. OCLC 221982801.
- Matley, J. W. (2013) [1941]. "C. W. Leadbeater at Bramshott Parish". The K. H. Letters to C. W. Leadbeater. Literary Licensing, LLC. pp. 105–108. ISBN 9781258882549.
- Motoyama, H. (2003) [1981]. Theories of the Chakras: Bridge to Higher Consciousness (Reprint ed.). New Age Books. ISBN 9788178220239.
- Oliveira, P. "With Madame Blavatsky". CWL World.
- Radhakrishnan, S. (2008). Indian Philosophy. Vol. 2 (2nd ed.). New Delhi: Oxford University Press. ISBN 9780195698428.
- Tillett, Gregory J. (2007). Charles Webster Leadbeater 1854–1934: a biographical study (PhD thesis). Sydney: University of Sydney. hdl:2123/1623. OCLC 220306221.
- Washington, P. (1995). Madame Blavatsky's baboon: a history of the mystics, mediums, and misfits who brought spiritualism to America. Schocken Books. ISBN 9780805241259.
- Wessinger, C. (2013). "The Second Generation Leaders of the Theosophical Society (Adyar)". In Hammer, O.; Rothstein, M. (eds.). Handbook of the Theosophical Current. Brill Handbooks on Contemporary Religion. Boston: Brill. pp. 33–50. ISBN 9789004235960.
- Сенкевич, А. Н. (2012). Елена Блаватская. Между светом и тьмой [Helena Blavatsky. Between Light and Darkness]. Носители тайных знаний (in Russian). Москва: Алгоритм. ISBN 978-5-4438-0237-4. OCLC 852503157.
