= Dream of Ravan =

The Dream of Ravan is a story that appeared originally in a series of articles in the Dublin University Magazine in 1853 and 1854. By some, it is believed to have been written by Mahatma Kuthumi. It was later reprinted as a book. It is a mystical treatise on Ravana, the primary antagonist in the Ramayana, and on its symbolic dream.
