= Akashic records =

Term in theosophy and anthroposophy

In Theosophy and the spiritual movement of Anthroposophy, the Akashic records are believed by some to be a compendium of all universal events, thoughts, words, emotions, and intent ever to have occurred in the past, present, or future, regarding not just humans, but all entities and life forms. They are believed by some theosophists to be encoded in a non-physical plane of existence known as the mental plane.

Akasha (ākāśa आकाश) is the Sanskrit word for "aether", "sky", or "atmosphere".

== History ==
=== Theosophical Society ===
The Sanskrit term akasha was introduced to the language of theosophy through Helena Blavatsky (1831–1891), who characterized it as a sort of life force; she also referred to "indestructible tablets of the astral light" recording both the past and future of human thought and action, but she did not use the term "akashic". The notion of an akashic record was further disseminated by Alfred Percy Sinnett in his book Esoteric Buddhism (1883) when he cites Henry Steel Olcott's A Buddhist Catechism (1881). Olcott wrote that "Buddha taught two things are eternal, viz, 'Akasa' and 'Nirvana': everything has come out of Akasa in obedience to a law of motion inherent in it, and, passes away. No thing ever comes out of nothing."

By C. W. Leadbeater's Clairvoyance (1899) the association of the term with the idea was complete, and he identified the akashic records by name as something a clairvoyant could read. In his 1913 book, Man: Whence, How and Whither, Leadbeater claims to record the history of Atlantis and other civilizations as well as the future society of Earth in the 28th century.

Alice A. Bailey wrote in her book The Light of the Soul on The Yoga Sutras of Patanjali – Book 3 – Union Achieved and Its Results (1927):

The akashic record is like an immense photographic film, registering all the desires and earth experiences of our planet. Those who perceive it will see pictured thereon:

1. The life experiences of every human being since time began,
2. The reactions to experience of the entire animal kingdom,
3. The aggregation of the thought-forms of a karmic nature (based on desire) of every human unit throughout time. Only a trained occultist can distinguish between actual experience and those astral pictures created by imagination and keen desire.

=== Rudolf Steiner ===
The Austrian theosophist, and later founder of Anthroposophy, Rudolf Steiner used the Akashic records concept mainly in a series of articles in his journal Lucifer-Gnosis from 1904 to 1908, where he wrote about Atlantis and Lemuria, topics related to their purported history and civilization. Besides this, he used the term in the title of lectures on a Fifth Gospel held in 1913 and 1914, shortly after the foundation of the Anthroposophical Society and Steiner's exclusion from the Theosophical Society Adyar.

=== Other ===
Edgar Cayce claimed to be able to access the Akashic records. Musician Prince used references to akashic records as a storytelling device throughout his album The Rainbow Children, particularly in reference to the history of slavery in the United States. The character Obadiah Archer from the Valiant Comics universe series Archer & Armstrong is able to access the Akashic plane to mimic all known human and superhuman abilities since the 2012 reboot.

== See also ==
- Book of Life
- Collective unconscious
- Egregore
- Esoteric cosmology
- Ervin László
- The Library of Babel
