= Occult Chemistry =

Theosophical book published in 1908

- Author: Annie Besant; C.W. Leadbeater
- Publisher: Theosophical Publishing House Adyar
- Publication date: 1908
- Media type: Hardback
- Pages: 92+22
- ISBN: 1-56459-678-8
- OCLC: 77847789

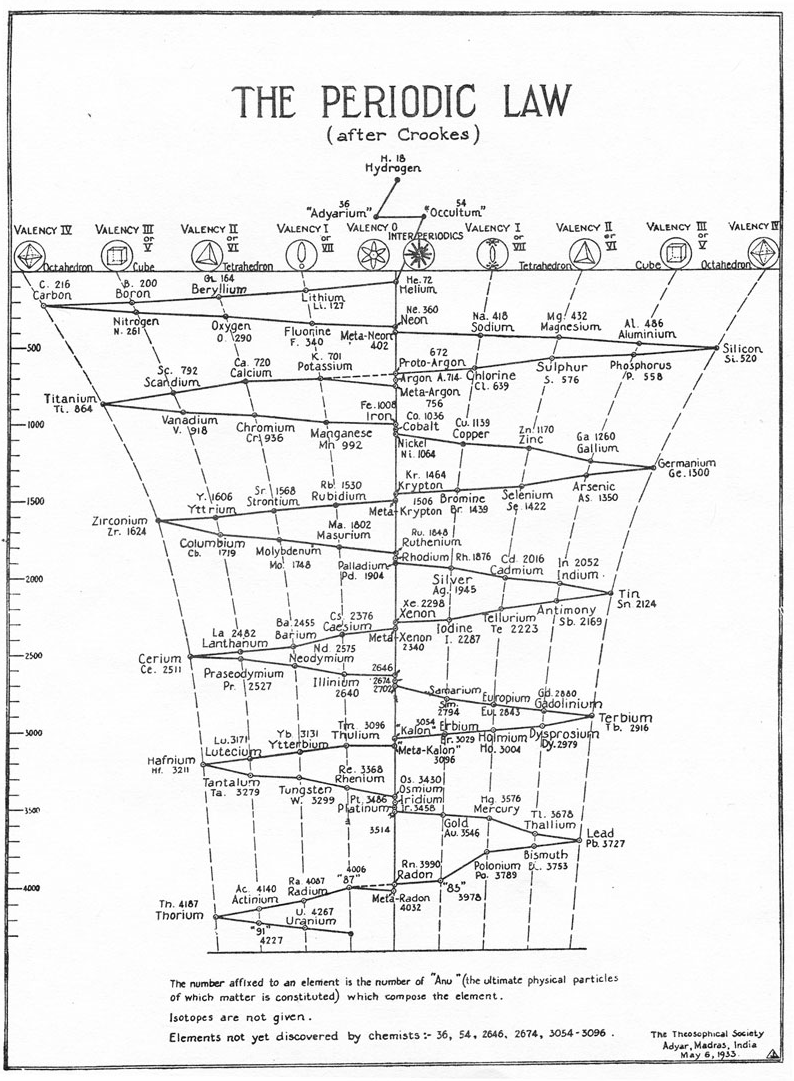
The Periodic Law: the number affixed to an element is the number of "Anu" (the ultimate physical particles of which matter is constituted).

Occult Chemistry: Investigations by Clairvoyant Magnification into the Structure of the Atoms of the Periodic Table and Some Compounds (originally subtitled A Series of Clairvoyant Observations on the Chemical Elements) is a book written by Annie Besant and C.W. Leadbeater, who were both members of the Theosophical Society based in Adyar, India. Besant was at the time the president of the society, having succeeded Henry Olcott after his death in 1907.

== Overview ==
The first edition reprinting articles from The Theosophist was published in 1908, followed by a second edition edited by Alfred Percy Sinnett in 1919, and a third edition edited by Curuppumullage Jinarajadasa in 1951.

Since the first edition was published in 1908, the book is in the public domain, and available in whole or in excerpts, on many sites on the internet.

Occult Chemistry states that the structure of chemical elements can be assessed through clairvoyant observation with the microscopic vision of the third eye. Observations were carried out between 1895 and 1933. "The book consists both of coordinated and illustrated descriptions of presumed etheric counterparts of the atoms of the then known chemical elements, and of other expositions of occult physics."

== Critical reception ==
Academic criticism is available in Chapter 2 of Modern Alchemy: Occultism and the Emergence of Atomic Theory, and in an online article from the Chemistry department at Yale University.

Critics regard the book to be an example of pseudoscience. According to Philip Ball, most scientists did not take the book seriously.

== See also ==
- Clairvoyance
- How Theosophy Came to Me
- Thought-Forms
