= Hiroshi Motoyama =

Japanese academic (1925–2015)

Hiroshi Motoyama (本山 博, Motoyama Hiroshi; December 15, 1925 – September 19, 2015) was a Japanese parapsychologist, spiritual instructor and author whose primary topic was spiritual self-cultivation and the relationship between the mind and body. Motoyama emphasized the meditative practices of Samkhya/Yoga, karma, reincarnation and Hindu theories of the chakras.

== Theory and Method ==
Motoyama's philosophical system was based on his experiences of meditation. His philosophy was based on the idea that no individual philosophical system is without its faults. Because of this, his philosophy appears to be an eclectic blend of seemingly disparate philosophies, but this is far from the case. His system is centralized upon Samkhya philosophy due to its explanatory efficacy, but primarily because of its utilization by Patañjali. Because of the attention to detail found in the Yoga Sutras of Patanjali, Motoyama emphasizes the eight steps of yogic training. However, he broadens the scope of samkhya here, extending the ultimate (the isolated Purusha) beyond the limitations of being. Borrowing from Kitaro Nishida, Dr. Motoyama uses the term basho (場所; literally "place") to define the field that sustains being itself. This basho is beyond the categories of being/non-being and birth/death. One who abandons individuality itself becomes a basho-being by completely annihilating themselves. This is very much in line with the Buddhist Jhānas and the Mahayana notion of Śūnyatā. Thus, basho-being is roughly synonymous with "buddha." The basho is the limit of and that which sustains our universe, beyond which, Motoyama states, is God. In brief, Motoyama's system is a synthesis of Samkhya (atheistic), Buddhism (non-theistic) and Shinto (theism) that incorporates yogic cultivation, the energy systems of the body-mind as well as faith in God.

== Selected English publications ==
- Science and the Evolution of Religion: The Way to World Religion. Translated by Arthur H. Thornhill III. (2009)
- Karma and Reincarnation: The key to Spiritual Evolution & Enlightenment. Translated by Rande Brown Ouch. (2009)
- Being and the Logic of Interactive Function. Translated by Shigenori Nagatomo & John W. M. Krummel. (2009)
- Motoyama Meridian Exercises for Ki Practice with Kiyomi Kuratani. (2009)
- Varieties of Mystical Experience I: Path to Self-Realization (Volume 1). (2006)
- What Is Religion?; Religion for a Global Society. Translated by Lee Seaman. (2006)
- Awakening of the Chakras and Emancipation. (2003)
- Religion and Humanity for a Global Society. Translated by Shigenori Nagatomo & David E. Shaner. (2001)
- Comparisons of Diagnostic Methods in Western & Eastern Medicine: A Correlation Between KI Energy And Environmental Conditions. (1999)
- Measurements of Ki Energy Diagnoses & Treatments: Treatment principles of Oriental Medicine from an Electrophysiological Viewpoint. (1997)
- A Study of Yoga from Eastern & Western Medical Viewpoints. (1993)
- Toward a Superconsciousness: Meditational Theory and Practice. Translated by Shigenori Nagatomo & Clifford R. Ames. (1990)
- Theories of the Chakras: Bridge to Higher Consciousness. (1980s)
- Science and the evolution of consciousness: Chakras, ki, and psi. Translated by Rande Brown. (1978)
- Hypnosis and Religious Super-Consciousness. (1971)
- The Correlation Between Psi Energy and Ki: Unification of Religion and Science. (1971)
