= Curuppumullage Jinarajadasa =

Sri Lankan theosophist

Jinarajadasa Curuppumullage
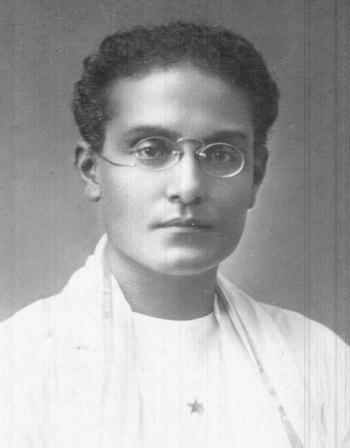
- Curuppumullage Jinarajadasa
- Born: 16 December 1875; Ceylon (modern Sri Lanka)
- Died: 18 June 1953 (aged 77); United States
- Education: Ananda College; University of Cambridge; University of Pavia
- Known for: Theosophy
- Spouse: Dorothy M. Graham

Curuppumullage Jinarajadasa (16 December 1875, British Ceylon – 18 June 1953, United States) was a Ceylonese author, occultist, freemason and theosophist. The fourth president of the Theosophical Society, Jinarajadasa was one of the world's foremost Theosophical authors, having published more than 50 books and more than 1600 articles in periodicals during his life. His interests and writings included religion, philosophy, literature, art, science and occult chemistry. He was also a rare linguist, who had the ability to work in many European languages.

== Early life ==
Jinarajadasa was born on 16 December 1875 in Ceylon (modern Sri Lanka) to a family of Sinhalese parents. He was one of the first students of Ananda College, Colombo. In 1889, when Charles Webster Leadbeater, the first principal of Ananda College was asked by A.P. Sinnett to come back to England to tutor his son, Leadbeater agreed and also brought one of his pupils, Jinarajadasa, to England with him. Thanks to Leadbeater, Jinarajadasa went to St John's College, Cambridge where he studied oriental languages and four years later took his Degree in the Oriental Languages Tripos.

== Career ==
He then came back to Ceylon and became the vice principal of Ananda College in Colombo. Jinarajadasa returned to Europe, to study at the University of Pavia, Italy. He soon became proficient in Italian, French, Spanish and Portuguese. Around 1904 he visited Chicago, where he met and influenced Weller van Hook, the well-known surgeon and author, who then became a theosophist. During his lifetime, Jinarajadasa traveled to many countries despite all the war difficulties of that era for his devoted service to Theosophy.

He also traveled to South America, where he lectured in Spanish and Portuguese and founded branches of the Theosophical Society (TS). He was the Vice-President of the Theosophical Society from 1921 to 1928. After the death of Dr George Arundale in 1945, Jinarajadasa became president of the Theosophical Society Adyar. In 1949 he founded the School of Wisdom in Adyar, which attracted students from many countries. He was also a Freemason, in Lodge Maa Kheru, no. 957 in the British Federation of what is now the International Order of Freemasonry for Men and Women, LE DROIT HUMAIN. He reached the highest degree of the Ancient and Accepted Scottish Rite, the 33rd, and was a founding member of Lodge International Concord, no. 977. Curuppumullage Jinarajadasa was the president of Theosophical Society until his death on 18 June 1953 in the United States.

== Personal life ==
On 11 November 1916 (in Kensington, West London), Jinarajadasa married British feminist, Dorothy May Graham (née May Dorothea Graham; 19 March 1881 - 13 January 1963), who founded the Women's Indian Association (WIA) in Adyar with Annie Besant and Margaret Cousins in 1917. She accompanied him in his travels around the world for some years. At one stage of his life, he resided in Brazil.

By 1953, he declined renomination as president of the Theosophical Society due to poor health and installed Nilakanta Sri Ram as his successor. He visited America where he died on 18 June 1953 at the national headquarters of the Theosophical Society, called "Olcott". His body was cremated; half of his ashes were sent to Adyar for deposit in the Garden of Remembrance there. The rest were kept at Olcott until the late 1990s, when they were deposited in an American Garden of Remembrance created to receive them.

== Works (selection) ==
Jinarajadasa wrote many works on Theosophy, Theology, philosophy, literature, art and science. He also participated in Annie Besant's and Charles Leadbeater's researches on Occult Chemistry.

In 1913, Jinarajadasa was awarded the Subba Row Medal for his contribution to Theosophical literature.

- Art and the Emotions, 1922
- Art As Will and Idea, 1927
- The Bhagavad Gita, 1915
- Art as a factor in the soul's evolution, 1915
- Christ and Buddha, 1908
- Christ the Logos, 1920
- Clairvoyant Investigations, 1947
- The Conventions of the Indian Constitution, 1921
- Did Madame Blavatsky Forge the Mahatma Letters?, 1934
- Discourses on the Bhagavad Gita, 1953 (A speech in Bangalore from 1946)
- The Divine Vision, Three Lectures Delivered in London, 1928
- The Early Teachings of the Masters 1881-1883, 1923
- The Faith That is the Life, 1920
- The Flame of Youth, 1931
- Flowers and Gardens: A Dream Structure, 1913
- First Principles of Theosophy, 1921
- The Future of the Theosophical Society, 1931
- Gods in Chains, 1929
- Goethe's Faust, Analysed in a Series of Incidents in Successive Incarnations, 1932
- The Heritage of Our Fathers, 1918
- How We Remember Our Past Lives, 1915
- The Ideas of Theosophy
- In His Name, 1913
- Is and Is to Be, 1940
- K.H. Letters to C.W. Leadbeater, 1941
- The Law of Christ, 1924
- Lecture Notes, 1930 (cover design by Manishi Dey)
- Letters of the Masters of Wisdom - First Series, 1919
- Letters of the Masters of Wisdom - Second Series, 1926
- The Lord's Work, 1917
- The Master: Meditations in Verse, 1931
- The Mediator and Other Theosophical Essays, 1927
- The Meeting of the East and the West, 1921
- The Message of the Future, 1916
- The Nature of Mysticism, 1917
- The New Humanity of Intuition, 1938
- Occult Chemistry, 1908 (editor of 1951 3rd edition)
- Practical Theosophy, 1918
- The Real and the Unreal, 1923
- The Reign of Law, Buddhist Essay, 1923
- Release: A Sequel to the Wonder Child
- The Religion and Philanthropy of Freemasonry
- The Ritual of the Mystic Star, 1939
- The Seven Veils of Consciousness, 1952
- The Smaller Buddhist Catechism, 1914 (jointly authored with C.J. Leadbetter)
- The Theosophist's Attitude, 1927 (jointly authored with C.J. Leadbetter)
- Theosophical Outlook, 1919
- Theosophy and Reconstruction, 1919
- Theosophy and Modern Thought, 1914
- Unfolding the Intuition, 1936 (with a foreword by Sidney A. Cook)
- The Way and After: A Theosophist's Viewpoint, 1939
- Women in Freemasonry, 1944
- The World as Idea, Emotion and Will, 1948

Jinarajadasa published more than 1,600 articles in periodicals such as The Adyar Bulletin, The American Theosophist, The Australian ES Bulletin, The Herald of the Star, The Messenger, Sishya (The Student), The Theosophic Messenger, The Theosophist, and World Theosophy. Jinarajadasa was also editor of The Theosophist for three periods.

=== The K.H. Letters to C.W. Leadbeater ===
It is a book compiled by Jinarajadasa; it was first published in 1941. Jinarajadasa wrote that C.W. Leadbeater joined the Theosophical Society in November 1883, and after his contact with Helena Blavatsky in London he decided to become a chela (disciple) of one of the Mahatmas.

First Letter from the Master

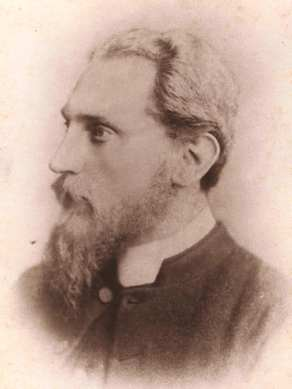
The Rev. C.W. Leadbeater, England, circa 1882.

At the beginning of the book Jinarajadasa proclaimed that an incident with receiving certain letters from the Master K.H. (Note: The originals of the Kuthumi's letters were put in the archive of the Theosophical Society in Adyar.) was very great Leadbeater's success. (Note: Jinarajadasa wrote, "I will let Mr. Leadbeater now take up the story", and quoted Leadbeater's book How Theosophy Came to Me (1930).) Leadbeater reminisced that he wrote a letter to the Master K.H. In that letter it was said that "his one great wish has been to become chela but it would be almost impossible without going out to India." Then Leadbeater entrusted the letter to a medium William Eglinton and his "control" Ernest. He talked later:

"I waited for some months, but no reply came, and whenever I went to Eglinton's séances and happened to encounter Ernest I always asked him when I might expect my answer. He invariably said that my letter had been duly delivered, but that nothing had yet been said about an answer, and that he could do no more."

Leadbeater received a reply on the morning of October 31, 1884. The letter of the Master K.H. was to be posted in England, on envelope it was typed "Kensington" (it is a postal district in the west of London) and "OC-30-84" (it is the date).

Master Kuthumi replied in this letter that it was not required to spend 7 years im India to be a chela.

In the book Jinarajadasa gave about thirty detailed commentaries to the statements of the first Master's letter.

Second letter from the Master

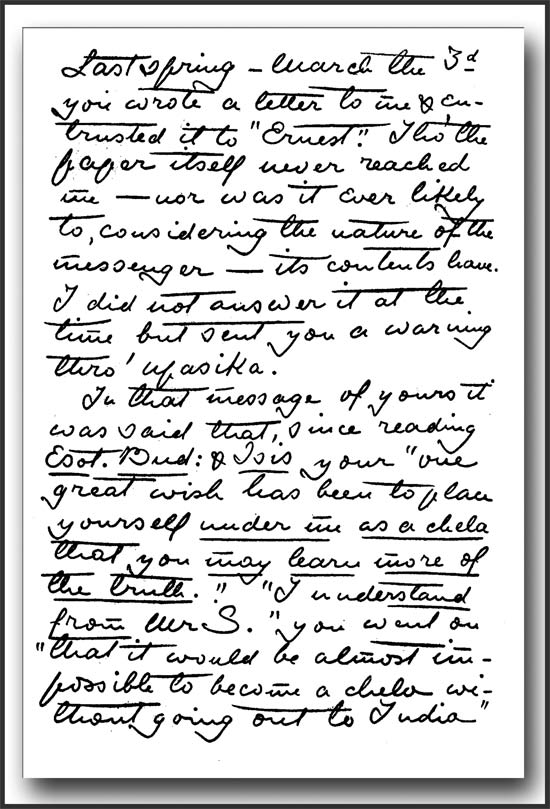
Facsimile (a fragment) of the first letter from the Master K.H.

Jinarajadasa stated that Leadbeater wrote "his second letter to the Master K.H., in reply to the Master's communication, and took it with him to London. Here we have the story of the next events in this striking drama from Mr. Leadbeater himself." Leadbeater was reminiscing that he wished to say in answer to this that "his circumstances were such that it would be impossible for him to come to Adyar for three months, and then return to the work in which he was then engaged; but that he was perfectly ready to throw up that work altogether and to devote his life absolutely to Master's service". Ernest having so conspicuously failed him, he knew of no way to get this message to the Master but to take it to Blavatsky, (Note: Tillett wrote that Leadbeater "hoped to be able to send a reply to K.H. via Mrs. Blavatsky.") and as she was to leave England on the following day for India, Leadbeater rushed up to London to see her.

Leadbeater talked that "it was with difficulty that he induced her to read the letter, as she said very decidedly that such communications were intended only for the recipient". He was obliged to insist, however, and at last she read it and asked him what he wished to say in reply. He answered to the above effect, and asked her how this information could be conveyed to the Master. She replied that he knew it already, referring of course to the exceedingly close relation in which she stood with him, so that whatever was within her consciousness was also within his when he wished it.

Leadbeater talked:

"She then told me to wait by her, and not to leave her on any account. I waited patiently all through the afternoon and evening, and even went with her quite late at night to Mrs. Oakley's house, where a number of friends were gathered to say farewell Madame Blavatsky sat in an easy chair by the fireside, talking brilliantly to those who were present, and rolling one of her eternal cigarettes, when suddenly her right hand was jerked out towards the fire in a very peculiar fashion, and lay palm upwards. She looked down at it in surprise, as I did myself, for I was standing close to her, leaning with an elbow on the mantelpiece; and several of us saw quite clearly a sort of whitish mist form in the palm of her hand and then condense into a piece of folded paper, which she at once handed to me, saying, 'There is your answer'."

Every one in the room crowded round, of course, but H.P.B. sent Leadbeater away outside to read it, saying that he must not let anyone see its contents. The letter (Note: See notes No. 9 and No. 14.) read:

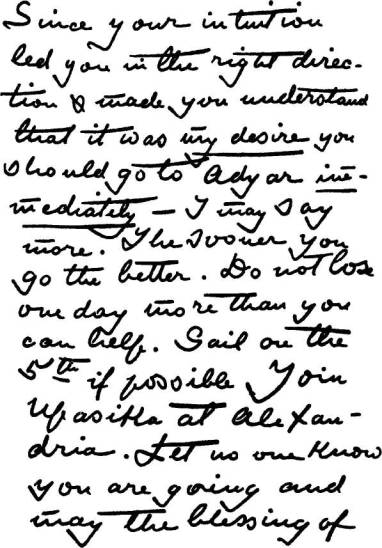
Facsimile (a fragment) of the second letter from the Master K.H.

"Since your intuition led you in the right direction and made you understand that it was my desire you should go to Adyar immediately, I may say more. The sooner you go the better. Do not lose one day more than you can help. Sail on the 5th if possible. Join Upasika at Alexandria. Let no one know that you are going, and may the blessing of our Lord (Note: Reigle claimed that in letters from the Master K.H. to A.P. Sinnett there is a number of references to Sang-gyas as "our Lord.") and my poor blessing shield you from every evil in your new life. (Note: See Reigle's note No. 19: "Facsimile in The K.H. Letters to C.W. Leadbeater, pp. 50-51.") Greeting to you, my new chela.

−K.H."

Two brief messages from the Master

The author wrote that during the trip from Ismailia to Cairo, Blavatsky received a precipitated message (Note: In his commentary Jinarajadasa described the method by which the Master's letters were written.) from the Master K.H., in which there was some words for Leadbeater:

"Tell Leadbeater that I am satisfied with his zeal and devotion."

In 1886 at Ceylon Leadbeater became first principal of the Buddhist High School (today Ananda College). (Note: Jinarajadasa stated that, "it was Mr. Leadbeater who helped to build up the Buddhist Educational Movement in Ceylon.") In this time at Colombo he received from Blavatsky a letter containing Master's addendum which was precipitated during passing through the post. The Master K.H. said in the addendum that he is "pleased with" Leadbeater.

== Criticism ==
His books on Theosophy were negatively reviewed by scientists. Science writer Hugh S. R. Elliot mocked Jinarajadasa's belief that every genus and species has a "group soul". Elliot noted that "for wherever a difficulty occurs, the author invents a spook to account for any process he cannot understand."
