= Koot Hoomi =

Indian religious leader

Koot Hoomi (also spelled Kuthumi, and frequently referred to simply as K.H.) is said to be one of the Mahatmas that inspired the founding of the Theosophical Society in 1875. In Theosophy it is believed that he engaged in a correspondence with two English Theosophists living in India, A. P. Sinnett and A. O. Hume. Their correspondence was published in the book The Mahatma Letters to A. P. Sinnett.

Skeptics have described Koot Hoomi and the other Mahatmas as a hoax.

== Personal features ==
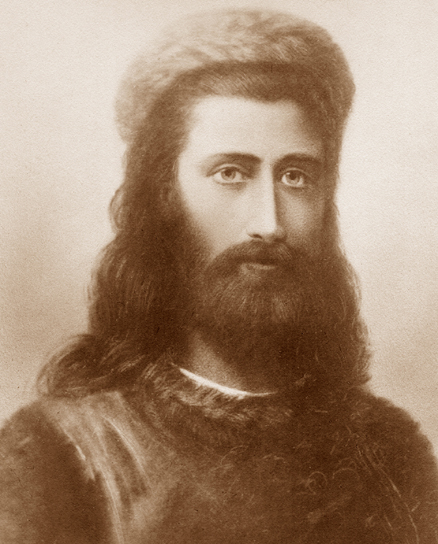
A portrait of Master Koot Hoomi by Hermann Schmiechen

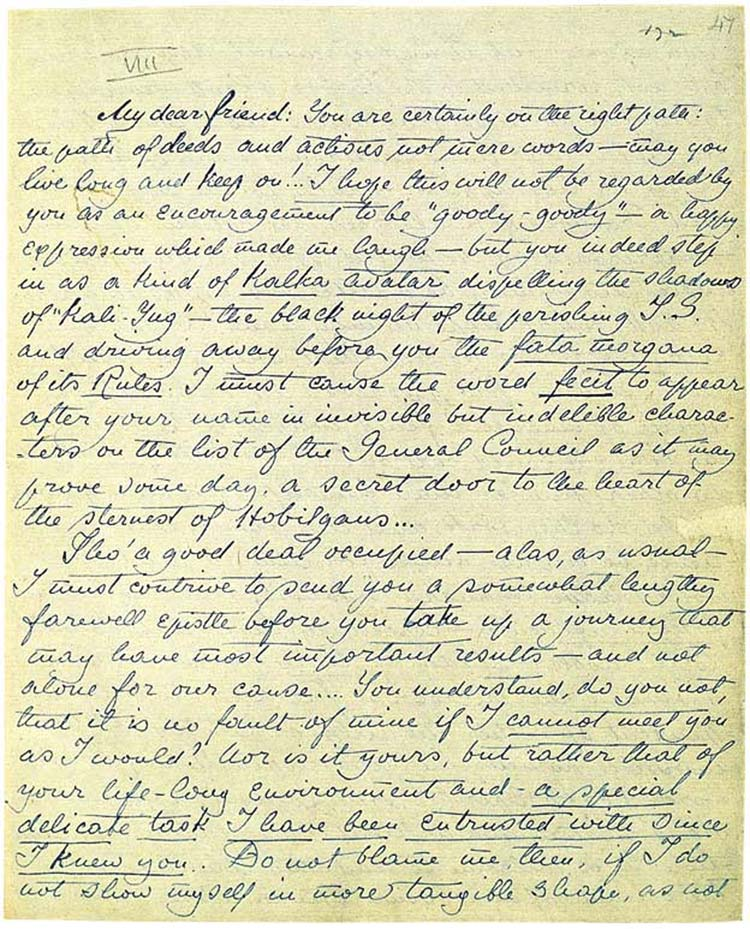
Facsimile (a fragment) of the 8th letter from the Koot Hoomi

Little descriptive references to K.H. occur in The Mahatma Letters to A. P. Sinnett and the writings of Mme. Blavatsky. The name Koot Hoomi seems to be a pseudonym. We find a reference to a "Rishi Kuthumi" in several Puranas, as for example in the Vishnu Purana (Book 3, Chapter 6) where he is said to be a pupil of Paushyinji. In reference to this Mme. Blavatsky wrote:

The name of Rishi Koothumi is mentioned in more than one Purana, and his Code is among the 18 Codes written by the various Rishis and preserved at Calcutta in the library of the Asiatic Society. But we have not been told whether there is any connection between our Mahatma of that name, and the Rishi, and we do not feel justified in speculating upon the subject. All we know is, that both are Northern Brahmans, while the Môryas are Kshatriyas.

K.H.'s early letters to Sinnett are signed with the name Koot Hoomi Lal Sing. However, later in the correspondence, he says the "Lal Singh" was an addition made by his disciple Djwal Khool:

Why have you printed The Occult World before sending it to me for revision? I would have never allowed the passage to pass; Nor the "Lal Sing" either foolishly invented as half a nom de plume by Djwal K. and carelessly allowed by me to take root without thinking of the consequences. . .

In an interview by Charles Johnston to H. P. Blavatsky, he described the handwriting of Master K.H. in the following way:

. . . evidently a man of very gentle and even character, but of tremendously strong will; logical, easy-going, and taking endless pains to make his meaning clear. It was altogether the handwriting of a cultivated and very sympathetic man.

Master KH is said to live in a house in a ravine in Tibet, near the house of Master Morya. In 1881, Colonel Henry S. Olcott wrote to A. O. Hume:

I have also personally known [Master Koot Hoomi] since 1875. He is of quite a different, a gentler, type, yet the bosom friend of the other [Master Morya]. They live near each other with a small Buddhist Temple about midway between their houses. In New York, I had . . . and a colored sketch on China silk of the landscape near [Koot Hoomi]'s and my Chohan's residences with a glimpse of the latter's house and of part of the little temple.

Mme. Blavatsky, in a letter to Mary Hollis Billing wrote:

Now Morya lives generally with Koot-Hoomi who has his house in the direction of the Kara Korum [Karakoram] Mountains, beyond Ladak, which is in Little Tibet and belongs now to Kashmire. It is a large wooden building in the Chinese fashion pagoda-like, between a lake and a beautiful mountain. . . .

This is confirmed by a reference given by Mahatma K. H. himself, in a letter to A. P. Sinnett:

I was coming down the defiles of Kouenlun — Karakorum you call them . . . and was crossing over to Lhadak on my way home.

C. W. Leadbeater described the physical appearance of Master KH as follows:

The Master Kuthumi wears the body of a Kashmiri Brahman, and is as fair in complexion as the average Englishman. He, too, has flowing hair, and His eyes are blue and full of joy and love. His hair and beard are brown, which, as the sunlight catches it, becomes ruddy with glints of gold. His face is somewhat hard to describe, for His expression is ever changing as He smiles; the nose is finely chiselled, and the eyes are large and of a wonderful liquid blue.

== K.H.'s retreat and initiation ==
Mme. Blavatsky on Oct 2, 1881 described this to Mrs. Mary Hollis Billing as follows:

K. H. or Koot-Hoomi is now gone to sleep for three months to prepare during this Sumadhi or continuous trance state for his initiation, the last but one, when he will become one of the highest adepts. Poor K. H. his body is now lying cold and stiff in a separate square building of stone with no windows or doors in it, the entrance to which is effected through an underground passage from a door in Toong-ting (reliquary, a room situated in every Thaten (temple) or Lamisery); and his Spirit is quite free. An adept might lie so for years, when his body was carefully prepared for it beforehand by mesmeric passes etc. It is a beautiful spot where he is now in the square tower. The Himalayas on the right and a lovely lake near the lamisery. His Cho-han (spiritual instructor, master, and the Chief of a Tibetan Monastery) takes care of his body. M . . also goes occasionally to visit him. It is an awful mystery that state of cataleptic sleep for such a length of time. . .

Master Morya in a letter to A. P. Sinnett described K.H.'s retreat as follows:

At a certain spot not to be mentioned to outsiders, there is a chasm spanned by a frail bridge of woven grasses and with a raging torrent beneath. The bravest member of your Alpine clubs would scarcely dare to venture the passage, for it hangs like a spider's web and seems to be rotten and impassable. Yet it is not; and he who dares the trial and succeeds — as he will if it is right that he should be permitted — comes into a gorge of surpassing beauty of scenery — to one of our places and to some of our people, of which and whom there is no note or minute among European geographers. At a stone's throw from the old Lamasery stands the old tower, within whose bosom have gestated generations of Bodhisatwas. It is there, where now rests your lifeless friend — my brother, the light of my soul, to whom I made a faithful promise to watch during his absence over his work.

== Skepticism ==
There is skepticism about the existence of Koot Hoomi. Gordon Stein in his book Encyclopedia of Hoaxes has noted:

"There were flaws in Blavatsky's work. Koot Hoomi, for example, claimed to have been an Indian (not a Tibetan) who studied in Germany. Yet he did not speak German, Hindi, or Punjabi. He spoke French and English, but wrote them using the overlined characteristic of Russians who write in English or French. The other Mahatma, Master Morya, had a weakness for pipe smoking, something that was strictly forbidden in Tibet. Both these Masters supposedly lived in Tibet. Other inconsistencies obvious now, were not enough to alert Sinnett that he was being hoaxed."

In 1884, Rev. George Patterson published an article "The Collapse of Koot Hoomi" which stated that Koot Hoomi did not exist. Based on information he received from Emma Coulomb it was alleged that Hoomi was actually a dummy made from cloth with a painted face that her husband Alexis Coulomb wore on his shoulders at night. Blavatsky denied the accusations of fraud.

Moncure D. Conway visited Blavatsky and investigated claims of the Mahatmas in 1884. He suggested that Hoomi was a fictitious creation of Blavatsky. Conway wrote that Blavatsky "created the imaginary Koothoomi (originally Kothume) by piecing together parts of the names of her two chief disciples, Olcott and Hume."

== See also ==
- Alice A.Bailey
- Hodgson Report
- K.H. Letters to C.W. Leadbeater
- Helena Roerich
