= Robert S. Ellwood =

American academic, author and expert on world religions (1933–2025)

- Born: July 17, 1933; Normal, Illinois, U.S.
- Died: June 5, 2025 (aged 91); Claremont, California, U.S.
- Other name: Robert Scott Ellwood Jr.
- Education: University of Colorado; University of Chicago
- Occupations: University professor and author on world religions
- Spouse: Gracia Fay Bouwman
- Children: 2

Robert S. Ellwood (July 17, 1933 – June 5, 2025) was an American academic who focused on world religions.

Ellwood was educated at the University of Colorado, Berkeley Divinity School and was awarded a PhD in History of Religions from the University of Chicago in 1967. He was Professor of World Religions at the University of Southern California from 1967 until 1997 and was then named professor emeritus.

== Background ==
Robert Scott Ellwood Jr. was born in Normal, Illinois July 17, 1933, the son of Robert Sr. and Knola Ellwood. Robert Sr. was a teacher in the high school affiliated with Illinois State Normal University, and a pioneer in the development of sociology as a high school subject. In 1945 the family moved to Chadron, Nebraska, where Robert Sr. became chair of the Education Department at the Nebraska State Teachers College located there.

He graduated from Chadron Preparatory School in 1951, and from the University of Colorado in 1954. He then attended Berkeley Divinity School in New Haven, CT, an Episcopal seminary now affiliated with Yale Divinity School. He graduated and was ordained a priest in the Episcopal Church in 1957. He pastored Christ Church, Central City, NE 1957-1960.

In 1961-62 Ellwood served as a chaplain in the U.S. Navy. While stationed in Okinawa and Japan he became interested in Japanese religion, and world religions generally. Reading the works of Mircea Eliade led to an interest in Eliade's structuralist and phenomenological approach to religion as a way of understanding similarities and differences in religions. As a consequence, in 1963 he entered the University of Chicago Divinity School's history of religion program led by Eliade, receiving the Ph.D. in 1967 after a final year of study in Japan. In 1967 Ellwood became a professor of religion at the University of Southern California, Los Angeles, serving there until retirement in 1997.

In 1988 he received a Fulbright Research Grant to study new religious movements in New Zealand, and spent six months there working in the national library in Wellington. He also taught briefly in the Universities of Cape Town and Natal in South Africa, and after retirement at Auburn University in Alabama. He was named Distinguished Emeritus Professor by U.S.C. in 2002, and Alumnus of the Year by the University of Chicago Divinity School in 2009.

== Work ==
As professor of religion at the University of Southern California, Los Angeles, Ellwood mainly taught courses on Eastern religions and the history of religion. His first book, The Feast of Kingship, about the Daijōsai or Japanese imperial accession ceremony, was based on his Ph.D. dissertation. Subsequently, given the tremendous spiritual ferment in California in the late 1960s, he became interested in new religious and spiritual movements in America, doing an informal survey of them in Los Angeles and publishing Religious and Spiritual Groups in Modern America.

He also wrote on the history of American religion in the 1950s and 1960s, as well as textbooks on world religions, religious studies, and Japanese religion. Cycles of Faith presented a theory of the comparative development of world religions. The Politics of Myth was a discussion of the controversial political histories of C.G. Jung, Mircea Eliade, and Joseph Campbell. A late series of three books offered a comparative view of mythologies.

Ellwood's approach to comparative religion has been fundamentally structuralist, phenomenological, and empathetic. He has sought through religion's material expression in art, architecture, rite, and practices to understand empathetically its inner meaning for adherents, always allowing for an immense range of individual responses, but recognizing also that religious forms have as it were a language of their own. In Cycles of Faith he further considers that the history of individual religions may have an internal dynamic of their own, as well as responding to outer history.

== Personal life and death ==
In 1965 Ellwood married Gracia Fay Bouwman, also a student in the University of Chicago Divinity School and subsequently an instructor in Evansville College, Indiana. They had two children, Richard Scott Lancelot (born 1974) and Fay Elanor (born 1977).

In 1976 he joined the Theosophical Society in America, serving as vice president of that organization 2002-05. He has also served as a priest in the Liberal Catholic Church, Province of the United States of America, a small denomination informally affiliated with Theosophy. He offered a few books of popular spirituality through the Theosophical publishing house, Quest Books. After retirement he and Gracia Fay moved to Krotona, a Theosophical community in Ojai, California.

Ellwood died in Claremont, California on June 5, 2025, at the age of 91.

== Works ==
- Religious and Spiritual Groups in Modern America (1973; rev. ed. coauthored by Harry Partin, 1988).
- One Way: The Jesus Movement and its Meaning (1973).
- The Feast of Kingship: Accession Ceremonies in Ancient Japan (1973).
- The Eagle and the Rising Sun: Americans and the New Religions of Japan (1974)
- Many Peoples, Many Faiths: An Introduction to the Religious Life of Humankind (orig. 1976); the 6th edition and subsequent editions are Many Peoples, Many Faiths: Women and Men in the World Religions and are coauthored by Barbara A. McGraw (1999–present).
- Introducing Religion (1978; 6th edn. 2024).
- Alternative Altars: Unconventional and Eastern Spirituality in America (1979).
- Mysticism and Religion (1980; rev. ed 1999, 2013).
- An Invitation to Japanese Civilization (1980).
- Tenrikyo: A Pilgrimage Faith (1982)
- Finding the Quiet Mind (1983)
- Finding Deep Joy (1984; rev. ed. 2001)
- Theosophy (1986)
- Islands of the Dawn: The Story of Alternative Spirituality in New Zealand (1993).
- The Sixties Spiritual Awakening: American Religion Moving from Modern to Postmodern (1994).
- The Pilgrim Self: Traveling the Path from Life to Life (1996).
- The Fifties' Spiritual Marketplace: American Religion in a Decade of Conflict (1997).
- The Cross and the Grail (1997)
- The Politics of Myth: A Study of C. G. Jung, Mircea Eliade, and Joseph Campbell (1999).
- 1950: Crossroads of American Religious Life (2000)
- Frodo's Quest: Living the Myth in the Lord of the Rings (2002)
- Cycles of Faith (2003)
- Introducing Japanese Religion (2008).
- Myth (2008).
- Tales of Darkness: The Mythology of Evil (2009).
- Tales of Lights and Shadows: The Mythology of the Afterlife (2010).
