= Olav Hammer =

Swedish religious historian (born 1958)

Olav Hammer (born 1958) is a Swedish professor emeritus at the University of Southern Denmark in Odense working in the field of history of religion.

== Career ==
Hammer has written four books in Swedish and one monograph, Claiming Knowledge: Strategies of Epistemology from Theosophy to the New Age (2001), and one co-authored book, Religious Innovation in the Hellenistic and Roman Periods (with Mikael Rothstein, 2023) in English. The monograph, which was also Hammer's doctoral dissertation in 2000 at Lund University, investigates the rhetorical strategies of legitimization of a number of related new religious movements. Hammer is also editor of several books, including Polemical Encounters (with Kocku von Stuckrad, Brill 2007), The Invention of Sacred Tradition (with James R. Lewis, Cambridge UP 2007), Alternative Christs (Cambridge UP 2009), Cambridge Companion to New Religious Movements (with Mikael Rothstein, Cambridge UP 2012), and Western Esotericism in Scandinavia (with Henrik Bogdan, Brill 2016). He has published numerous articles and contributions to edited volumes on Western esotericism, new religious movements, new age religiosity, alternative archaeology, religion and science, and religious polemics.

From 2009 to 2016 he was one of two executive editors of the journal Numen.

In 2002 the title of årets folkbildare in Sweden was bestowed on Hammer (an honor which could best be translated as "Public educator of the year"), by the society Föreningen Vetenskap och Folkbildning "for his balanced and pedagogical books about the history of new religions and the causes behind people's beliefs in pseudoscience."

== Awards ==
- årets folkbildare 2002
