= Theosophical mysticism =

System of connecting reality on the physical and the metaphysical level

Within the system of Theosophy, developed by occultist Helena Blavatsky and others since the second half of the 19th century, Theosophical mysticism draws upon various existing disciplines and mystical models, including Neo-platonism, Gnosticism, Western esotericism, Freemasonry, Hinduism and Buddhism.

== Overview of Blavatsky's teachings ==
The three fundamental propositions expounded in The Secret Doctrine are –

1. that there is an omnipresent, eternal, boundless, and immutable reality of which spirit and matter are complementary aspects;
2. that there is a universal law of periodicity or evolution through cyclic change; and
3. that all souls are identical with the universal oversoul which is itself an aspect of the unknown reality.

Helena Blavatsky taught that Theosophy is neither revelation nor speculation. Blavatsky stated that Theosophy was an attempt at a gradual, faithful reintroduction of a hitherto hidden science called the occult science in Theosophical literature. According to Blavatsky occult science provides a description of reality not only at a physical level but also on a metaphysical one. Blavatsky said occult science had been preserved and practiced throughout history by carefully selected and trained individuals.

The Theosophical Society believes its precepts and doctrinal foundation will be verified when a Theosophist follows prescribed disciplines to develop metaphysical means of knowledge that transcend the limitations of the senses.

== Definition and origin ==
Theosophy was considered by Blavatsky to be "the substratum and basis of all the world-religions and philosophies". In The Key to Theosophy, she stated the following about the meaning and origin of the term:

ENQUIRER. Theosophy and its doctrines are often referred to as a new-fangled religion. Is it a religion?

THEOSOPHIST. It is not. Theosophy is Divine Knowledge or Science.
ENQUIRER. What is the real meaning of the term?
THEOSOPHIST. "Divine Wisdom," (Theosophia) or Wisdom of the gods, as (theogonia), genealogy of the gods. The word theos means a god in Greek, one of the divine beings, certainly not "God" in the sense attached in our day to the term. Therefore, it is not "Wisdom of God", as translated by some, but Divine Wisdom such as that possessed by the gods. The term is many thousand years old.
ENQUIRER. What is the origin of the name?

THEOSOPHIST. It comes to us from the Alexandrian philosophers, called lovers of truth, Philaletheians, from phil "loving," and aletheia "truth". The name Theosophy dates from the third century of our era, and began with Ammonius Saccas and his disciples, who started the Eclectic Theosophical system.

According to her, all real lovers of divine wisdom and truth had, and have, a right to the name of Theosophist. Blavatsky discussed the major themes of Theosophy in several major works, including The Secret Doctrine, Isis Unveiled, The Key to Theosophy, and The Voice of the Silence. She also wrote over 200 articles in various theosophical magazines and periodicals. Contemporaries of Blavatsky, as well as later theosophists, contributed to the development of this school of theosophical thought, producing works that at times sought to elucidate the ideas she presented (see Gottfried de Purucker), and at times to expand upon them. (Note: Some of the later works have become the focus of, or have contributed to, lively discussion among leading proponents of theosophy, and on occasion have led to serious doctrinal disputes. See Neo-Theosophy.) Since its inception, and through doctrinal assimilation or divergence, Theosophy has also given rise to or influenced the development of other mystical, philosophical, and religious movements.

Theosophists attribute the origin of Theosophy to a universal striving for spiritual fulfilment, which they assert exists in all cultures and at all times. According to Theosophical texts, kindred practices and philosophies are found in an unbroken chain in India, but are also said to have existed in Ancient Greece and to be hinted in the writings of Plato (427–347 BCE), Plotinus (204–270), and other neo-Platonists.

=== Scope ===
Broadly, Theosophy attempts to reconcile humanity's scientific, philosophical, and religious disciplines and practices into a unified worldview. As it largely employs a synthesizing approach, it makes extensive use of the vocabulary and concepts of many philosophical and religious traditions. However these, along with all other fields of knowledge, are investigated, amended, and explained within an esoteric or occult framework. In often elaborate exposition, Theosophy's all-encompassing worldview proposes explanations for the origin, workings and ultimate fate of the universe and humanity; it has therefore also been called a system of "absolutist metaphysics". (Note: Blavatsky stated that in practical terms, her Theosophical exposition concerned itself only "with our planetary System and what is visible around it". "Bear in mind that the Stanzas given treat only of the Cosmogony of our own planetary System and what is visible around it, .... The secret teachings with regard to the Evolution of the Universal Kosmos cannot be given, .... Moreover the Teachers say openly that not even the highest Dhyani-Chohans have ever penetrated the mysteries beyond those boundaries that separate the milliards of Solar systems from the 'Central Sun,' as it is called. Therefore, that which is given, relates only to our visible Kosmos, ...." However, some of her statements have been unclear or contradictory on the subject and she often stressed, "Everything in the Universe follows analogy. 'As above, so below'".)

=== Methodology ===
According to Blavatsky, Theosophy is neither revelation nor speculation. (Note: "Faith is a word not to be found in theosophical dictionaries: we say knowledge based, on observation and experience. There is this difference, however, that while the observation and experience of physical science lead the Scientists to about as many 'working' hypotheses as there are minds to evolve them, our knowledge consents to add to its lore only those facts which have become undeniable, and which are fully and absolutely demonstrated. We have no two beliefs or hypotheses on the same subject.") It is portrayed as an attempt at gradual, faithful reintroduction of a hitherto hidden science, which is called in Theosophical literature The Occult Science. According to Blavatsky, this postulated science provides a description of Reality not only at a physical level, but also on a metaphysical one. The Occult Science is said to have been preserved (and practiced) throughout history by carefully selected and trained individuals. (Note: "It is the uninterrupted record covering thousands of generations of Seers whose respective experiences were made to test and to verify the traditions passed orally by one early race to another, of the teachings of higher and exalted beings, who watched over the childhood of Humanity. That for long ages, the 'Wise Men' of the Fifth Race, ... had passed their lives in learning, not teaching. ... By checking, testing, and verifying in every department of nature the traditions of old by the independent visions of great adepts; i.e., men who have developed and perfected their physical, mental, psychic, and spiritual organizations to the utmost possible degree. No vision of one adept was accepted until it was checked and confirmed by the visions—so obtained as to stand as independent evidence—of other adepts, and by centuries of experiences.") Theosophists further assert that Theosophy's precepts and their axiomatic foundation may be verified by following certain prescribed disciplines that develop in the practitioner metaphysical means of knowledge, which transcend the limitations of the senses. It is commonly held by Theosophists that many of the basic Theosophical tenets may in the future be empirically and objectively verified by science, as it develops further.

==== Law of correspondences ====
In The Secret Doctrine, Blavatsky spoke of a basic item of cosmogony reflected in the ancient saying: "as above, so below". This item is used by many theosophists as a method of study and has been called "The Law of Correspondences". Briefly, the law of correspondences states that the microcosm is the miniature copy of the macrocosm and therefore what is found "below" can be found, often through analogy, "above". Examples include the basic structures of microcosmic organisms mirroring the structure of macrocosmic organisms (see septenary systems, below). The lifespan of a human being can be seen to follow, by analogy, the same path as the seasons of the Earth, and in theosophy it is postulated that the same general process is equally applied to the lifespan of a planet, a solar system, a galaxy and to the universe itself. Through the Law of Correspondences, a theosophist seeks to discover the first principles underlying various phenomena by finding the shared essence or idea, and thus to move from particulars to principles.

==== Applications ====
Applied Theosophy was one of the main reasons for the foundation of the Theosophical Society in 1875; the practice of Theosophy was considered an integral part of its contemporary incarnation. (Note: "The Society is a philanthropic and scientific body for the propagation of the idea of brotherhood on practical instead of theoretical lines. The Fellows may be Christians or Mussulmen, Jews or Parsees, Buddhists or Brahmins, Spiritualists or Materialists, it does not matter; but every member must be either a philanthropist, or a scholar, a searcher into Aryan and other old literature, or a psychic student. In short, he has to help, if he can, in the carrying out of at least one of the objects of the programme.") Theosophical discipline includes the practice of study, meditation, and service, which are traditionally seen as necessary for a holistic development. Also, the acceptance and practical application of the Society's motto and of its three objectives are part of the Theosophical life. Efforts at applying its tenets started early. Study and meditation are normally promoted in the activities of the Theosophical Society, and in 1908 an international charitable organization to promote service, the Theosophical Order of Service, was founded.

==== Terminology ====
Despite extensively using Sanskrit terminology in her works, many Theosophical concepts are expressed differently from in the original scriptures. To provide clarity on her intended meanings, Blavatsky's The Theosophical Glossary was published in 1892, one year after her death. According to its editor, George Robert Stowe Mead, Blavatsky wished to express her indebtedness to four works: the Sanskrit-Chinese Dictionary, the Hindu Classical Dictionary, Vishnu Purana, and The Royal Masonic Cyclopaedia.

=== Basic tenets ===
==== Three fundamental propositions ====
Blavatsky explained the essential component ideas of her cosmogony in her Masterpiece, The Secret Doctrine. She began with three fundamental propositions, of which she said:

Before the reader proceeds … it is absolutely necessary that he should be made acquainted with the few fundamental conceptions which underlie and pervade the entire system of thought to which his attention is invited. These basic ideas are few in number, and on their clear apprehension depends the understanding of all that follows…

The first proposition is that there is one underlying, unconditioned, indivisible Truth, variously called "the Absolute", "the Unknown Root", "the One Reality", etc. It is causeless and timeless, and therefore unknowable and non-describable: "It is 'Be-ness' rather than Being". (Note: "An Omnipresent, Eternal, Boundless, and Immutable PRINCIPLE on which all speculation is impossible, since it transcends the power of human conception and could only be dwarfed by any human expression or similitude.") However, transient states of matter and consciousness are manifested in IT, in an unfolding gradation from the subtlest to the densest, the final of which is physical plane. According to this view, manifest existence is a "change of condition" (Note: "The expansion 'from within without'..., does not allude to an expansion from a small centre or focus, but, without reference to size or limitation or area, means the development of limitless subjectivity into as limitless objectivity. ...It implies that this expansion, not being an increase in size—for infinite extension admits of no enlargement—was a change of condition." Manifest existence is often called "Illusion" in Theosophy, owing to its conceptual and actual differentiation from the only Reality.) and therefore neither the result of creation nor a random event.

Everything in the universe is informed by the potentialities present in the "Unknown Root," and manifest with different degrees of Life (or energy), Consciousness, and Matter. (Note: "Everything in the Universe, throughout all its kingdoms, is CONSCIOUS: i.e., endowed with a consciousness of its own kind and on its own plane of perception. We men must remember that because we do not perceive any signs—which we can recognise—of consciousness, say, in stones, we have no right to say that no consciousness exists there. There is no such thing as either 'dead' or 'blind' matter, as there is no 'Blind' or 'Unconscious' Law".)

The second proposition is "the absolute universality of that law of periodicity, of flux and reflux, ebb and flow". Accordingly, manifest existence is an eternally re-occurring event on a "boundless plane": "'the playground of numberless Universes incessantly manifesting and disappearing,'" each one "standing in the relation of an effect as regards its predecessor, and being a cause as regards its successor", doing so over vast but finite periods of time. (Note: Blavatsky states that each complete cycle lasts 311,040,000,000,000 years.)

Related to the above is the third proposition: "The fundamental identity of all Souls with the Universal Over-Soul... and the obligatory pilgrimage for every Soul—a spark of the former—through the Cycle of Incarnation (or 'Necessity') in accordance with Cyclic and Karmic law, during the whole term." The individual souls are seen as units of consciousness (Monads) that are intrinsic parts of a universal oversoul, just as different sparks are parts of a fire. These Monads undergo a process of evolution where consciousness unfolds and matter develops. This evolution is not random, but informed by intelligence and with a purpose. Evolution follows distinct paths in accord with certain immutable laws, aspects of which are perceivable on the physical level. One such law is the law of periodicity and cyclicity; another is the law of karma or cause and effect.

==== Esotericism and symbolism ====
In The Secret Doctrine, Blavatsky quoted Gerald Massey a "suggestive analogy between the Aryan or Brahmanical and the Egyptian esotericism" She said that the "seven rays of the Chaldean Heptakis or Iao, on the Gnostic stones" represent the seven large stars of the ancient Egyptian Great Bear constellation, the seven elemental powers, and the Hindu "seven Rishis". Blavatsky saw the seven rays of the Vedic sun deity Vishnu as representing the same concept as the "astral fluid or 'Light' of the Kabalists," and said that the seven emanations of the lower seven sephiroth are the "primeval seven rays", and "will be found and recognized in every religion." (Note: Blavatsky, Helena P. (1893). The secret doctrine: the synthesis of science, religion, and philosophy. Vol. 1 (Original from Harvard University ed.). Theosophical Publishing Society. pp. 129–130, 523, 573–4. ISBN 9781417911042.)

Theosophy holds that the manifested universe is ordered by the number seven, a common claim among esoteric and mystical doctrines and religions. Thus, the evolutionary "pilgrimage" proceeds cyclically through seven stages, with the three first steps involving an apparent involution, the fourth one being one of equilibrium, and the last three involving a progressive development.

There are seven symbols of particular importance to the Society's symbology:

1. the seal of the Society
2. a serpent biting its tail
3. the gnostic cross (near the serpent's head)
4. the interlaced triangles
5. the cruxansata (in the centre)
6. the pin of the Society, composed of cruxansata and serpent entwined, forming together "T.S.", and
7. Om (or aum), the sacred syllable of the Vedas.

The seal of the Society contains all of these symbols, except aum, and thus contains, in symbolic form, the doctrines its members follow.

==== Septenary systems ====
In the Theosophical view all major facets of existence manifest following a seven-fold model: "Our philosophy teaches us that, as there are seven fundamental forces in nature, and seven planes of being, so there are seven states of consciousness in which man can live, think, remember and have his being."

===== Seven cosmic planes =====
The Cosmos does not consist only of the physical plane that can be perceived with the five senses, but there is a succession of seven Cosmic planes of existence, composed of increasingly subtler forms of matter-energy, and in which states of consciousness other than the commonly known can manifest. Blavatsky described the planes according to these states of consciousness. In her system, for example, the plane of the material and concrete mind (lower mental plane) is classified as different from the plane of the spiritual and holistic mind (higher mental plane). Later Theosophists like Charles Webster Leadbeater and Annie Besant classified the seven planes according to the kind of subtle matter that compose them. Since both the higher and lower mental planes share the same type of subtle matter, they regard them as one single plane with two subdivisions. In this later view the seven cosmic planes include (from spiritual to material):

1. Adi (the supreme, a divine plane not reached by human beings)
2. Anupadaka (the parentless, also a divine plane home of the divine spark in human beings, the Monad)
3. Atmic (the spiritual plane of Man's Higher Self)
4. Buddhic (the spiritual plane of intuition, love, and wisdom)
5. Mental (with a higher and lower subdivisions, this plane bridges the spiritual with the personal)
6. Emotional (a personal plane that ranges from lower desires to high emotions)
7. Physical plane (a personal plane which again has two subdivisions the dense one perceivable by our five senses, and an etheric one that is beyond these senses)

===== Seven principles and bodies =====
Just as the Cosmos is not limited to its physical dimension, human beings have also subtler dimensions and bodies. The "Septenary Nature of Man" was described by Blavatsky in, among other works, The Key to Theosophy; in descending order, it ranges from a postulated purely spiritual essence (called a "Ray of the Absolute") to the physical body.

The Theosophical teachings about the constitution of human beings talk about two different, but related, things: principles and bodies. Principles are the seven basic constituents of the universe, usually described by Mme. Blavatsky as follows:

1. Physical
2. Astral (later called etheric)
3. Prana (or vital)
4. Kama (animal soul)
5. Manas (mind, or human soul)
6. Buddhi (spiritual soul)
7. Atma (Spirit or Self)

These Principles in Man may or may not form one or more bodies. Blavatsky's teachings about subtle bodies were few and not very systematic. In an article she described three subtle bodies:

- Linga Sharira – the Double or Astral body
- Mayavi-rupa – the "Illusion-body"
- Causal Body – the vehicle of the higher Mind

The Linga Sharira is the invisible double of the human body, elsewhere referred to as the etheric body or doppelgänger and serves as a model or matrix of the physical body, which conforms to the shape, appearance and condition of his "double". The linga sarira can be separated or projected a limited distance from the body. When separated from the body it can be wounded by sharp objects. When it returns to the physical frame, the wound will be reflected in the physical counterpart, a phenomenon called "repercussion." At death, it is discarded together with the physical body and eventually disintegrates or decomposes. This can be seen over the graves like a luminous figure of the man that was, during certain atmospheric conditions.

The mayavi-rupa is dual in its functions, being: "...the vehicle both of thought and of the animal passions and desires, drawing at one and the same time from the lowest terrestrial manas (mind) and Kama, the element of desire."

The higher part of this body, containing the spiritual elements gathered during life, merges after death entirely into the causal body; while the lower part, containing the animal elements, forms the Kama-rupa, the source of "spooks" or apparitions of the dead.

Therefore, besides the dense physical body, the subtle bodies in a human being are:

- Etheric body (vehicle of prana)
- Emotional or astral body (vehicle of desires and emotions)
- Mental body (vehicle of the concrete or lower mind)
- Causal body (vehicle of the abstract or higher mind)

These bodies go up to the higher mental plane. The two higher spiritual Principles of Buddhi and Atma do not form bodies proper but are something more like "sheaths".

=== Criticism ===
Blavatsky was influential on spiritualism and related subcultures: "The western esoteric tradition has no more important figure in modern times." She wrote prolifically, publishing thousands of pages and debate continues about her work. She taught about very abstract and metaphysical principles, but also sought to denounce and correct superstitions that, in her view, had grown in different esoteric religions. Some of these statements are controversial. For example, she quotes Anna Kingsford and Edward Maitland's book The Perfect Way. "It is 'Satan who is the God of our planet and the only God', and this without any metaphorical allusion to its wickedness and depravity," wrote Blavatsky, in The Secret Doctrine. "For he is one with the Logos." He is whom "every dogmatic religion, preeminently the Christian, points out as [...] the enemy of God, [... but is] in reality, the highest divine Spirit—Occult Wisdom on Earth. [...] Thus, the Latin Church [... and] the Protestant Church [... both] are fighting against divine Truth, when repudiating and slandering the Dragon of Esoteric Divine Wisdom. Whenever they anathematize the Gnostic Solar Chnouphis, the Agathodaemon Christos, or the Theosophical Serpent of Eternity, or even the Serpent of Genesis." In this reference Blavatsky explains that he whom the Christian dogma calls Lucifer was never the representative of the evil in ancient myths but, on the contrary, the light-bringer (which is the literal meaning of the name Lucifer). According to Blavatsky the church turned him into Satan (which means "the opponent") to misrepresent pre-Christian beliefs and fit him into the newly framed Christian dogmas. A similar view is also shared by some Christian Gnostics, ancient and modern.

Throughout much of Blavatsky's public life her work drew harsh criticism from some of the learned authorities of her day, as for example when she said that the atom was divisible.

==== Helena Blavatsky's skeptics ====
Max Müller, the renowned philologist and orientalist, was scathing in his criticism of Blavatsky's Esoteric Buddhism. Whilst he was willing to give her credit for good motives, at least at the beginning of her career, in his view she ceased to be truthful both to herself and to others with her later "hysterical writings and performances". Müller felt he had to speak out when he saw the Buddha being "lowered to the level of religious charlatans, or his teaching misrepresented as esoteric twaddle". There is a nothing esoteric or secretive in Buddhism, he wrote, in fact the very opposite. "Whatever was esoteric was ipso facto not Buddha's teaching; whatever was Buddha's teaching was ipso facto not esoteric". (Note: For Sinnett's response and Müller's rejoinder, see Sinnett 1893 and Müller 1893b.) Blavatsky, it seemed to Müller, "was either deceived by others or carried away by her own imaginations" and that Buddha was "against the very idea of keeping anything secret".

Critics pronounced her claim of the existence of masters of wisdom to be utterly false, and accused her of being a charlatan, a false medium, (Note: According to Randi, her "messages were often in the form of small bits of paper that floated down from the ceiling above her. She attracted many prominent persons to the movement by her performance of these effective diversions.") evil, a spy for the Russians, a smoker of cannabis, a plagiarist, a spy for the English, a racist, and a falsifier of letters. Most of the accusations remain undocumented.

In The New York Times Edward Hower wrote, "Theosophical writers have defended her sources vehemently. Skeptics have painted her as a great fraud."

In the 1885 Hodgson Report to the Society for Psychical Research (SPR), Richard Hodgson concluded that Blavatsky was a fraud. (Note: According to Randi, the SPR exposed her techniques and equipment that "were shown to be the means by which she produced the written messages from her mahatmas, and it was revealed that she had deceived a disciple by hiring an actor wearing a dummy bearded head and flowing costume to impersonate" Koot Hoomi.) However, in 1986, the SPR published a critique by handwriting expert Vernon Harrison, "which discredited crucial elements" of Hodgeson's case against Blavatsky, nevertheless, "Theosophists have overinterpreted this as complete vindication," wrote Johnson, "when in fact many questions raised by Hodgson remain unanswered."

René Guénon wrote a detailed critique of Theosophy entitled Theosophism: history of a pseudo-religion (1921), in which he claimed that Blavatsky had acquired all her knowledge from reading books, and not from any supernatural masters. Guenon pointed out that Blavatsky was a regular visitor to a library in New York, where she had easy access to the works of Jacob Boehme, Eliphas Levi, the Kabbala and other Hermetic treatises. Guenon also wrote that Blavatsky had borrowed passages from extracts of the Kanjur and Tanjur, translated by the eccentric orientalist Sándor Kőrösi Csoma, published in 1836 in the twentieth volume of the Asiatic Researchers of Calcutta .

K. Paul Johnson suggests in his book The Masters Revealed: Madam Blavatsky and Myth of the Great White Brotherhood that the Masters that Madam Blavatsky claimed she had personally met are idealizations of certain people she had met during her lifetime.

The article "Talking to the Dead and Other Amusements" by Paul Zweig New York Times October 5, 1980, maintains that Madame Blavatsky's revelations were fraudulent.

Robert Todd Carroll in his book The skeptic's dictionary (2003) wrote that Blavatsky used trickery into deceiving others into thinking she had paranormal powers. Carroll wrote that Blavatsky had faked a materialization of a teacup and saucer as well as writing the messages from her masters herself.

==== Blavatsky's Theosophy connected to antisemitism, racism ====
Jackson Spielvogel and David Redles of the Simon Wiesenthal Center's Museum of Tolerance analyze Blavatsky's racial ideas in her book Secret Doctrine. According to Spielvogel and Redles, Blavatsky labeled some races superior and others inferior. They clarify that Blavatsky did not advocate "domination of one race over another" and that she was against violence. They comment that Blavatsky's work "helped to foster antisemitism, which is perhaps one of the reasons her esoteric work was so rapidly accepted in German circles." They state Blavatsky "sharply differentiated Aryan and Jewish religion" and believed "The Aryans were the most spiritual people on earth." They quote Blavatsky's writing in Secret Doctrine as stating Aryans used religion as an "everlasting lodestar" in contrast to Judaism which Blavatsky claimed was based on "mere calculation" while characterizing it as a "religion of hate and malice toward everyone and everything outside itself."

The first aim of the Theosophical Society she founded is "To form a nucleus of the Universal Brotherhood of Humanity, without distinction of race, creed, sex, caste or colour", and her writings also include references emphasizing the unity of humanity: "all men have spiritually and physically the same origin" and that "mankind is essentially of one and the same essence". Cranston quoted Blavatsky saying that in reality there is no inferior or low-grade races because all of it are one common humankind.

Blavatsky had posited that humanity evolved through a series of stages called Root Races, the present, the Aryan, being the Fifth Root Race (of seven). The Root Races do not refer to ethnicities. They represent evolutionary stages the whole of humanity is engaged in, each new Root Race being more advanced than the previous one. She taught that the earlier stage of evolution took place in Atlantis during the Fourth Root-Race. The Aryan Root Race was then only one more step in the evolutionary progression, to be eventually superseded by a more spiritual Root Race, the Sixth.

Regarding the concept of race as defined – in a comparatively more limited manner – by anthropology, sociology, and other disciplines, Blavatsky did not encourage superiority by any person or group, promoting the idea of the common origin and destiny of all humanity, and establishing the principle of universal brotherhood as the First Object of the Theosophical Society. She also proclaimed religious tolerance and inclusiveness stating, "Theosophists, collectively, respect the Bible as much as they do the sacred scriptures of other people, finding in it the same eternal truths as in the Vedas, the Zend-Avesta, the Tripitakas, etc." Conversely, Austrian/German ultra-nationalist Guido von List and his followers such as Lanz von Liebenfels, later selectively mixed parts of Blavatsky's occult philosophy with nationalistic and fascist ideas; this system of thought became known as Ariosophy. Some researchers, tracing the links between Ariosophy and Theosophy, stated that the latter relies mostly on "intellectual expositions of racial evolution". However, in The Key to Theosophy, Blavatsky had stated that "The Society is a philanthropic and scientific body for the propagation of the idea of brotherhood on practical instead of theoretical lines."

== See also ==
- Buddhism and Theosophy
- Esoteric Buddhism
- "The Esoteric Character of the Gospels"
- The Occult World

== Bibliography ==
- Blavatsky, Helena (1888a). The Secret Doctrine: The Synthesis of Science, Religion, and Philosophy. London: The Theosophical Publishing Company.
- —— (1888b). The First Message to WQ Judge, General Secretary of the American Section of the Theosophical Society..
- —— (December 1888c). "Dialogue between the two editors on astral bodies, or doppelgangers". Lucifer. 3 (16). London: Theosophical Publishing Society: 328–333. OCLC 804337810. Reprinted in De Zirkoff, Boris; Eklund, Dara, eds. (1988) [1964]. Collected writings. Vol. 10 (Reprint ed.). Wheaton, Il: Theosophical Publishing House. pp. 217–226. ISBN 978-0835671880.
- —— (1962) [1889]. The key to theosophy being a clear exposition in the form of question and answer of the ethics, science, and philosophy for the study of which the Universal brotherhood and Theosophical society has been founded (Reprint of original 1st ed.). Los Angeles: Theosophical Company. OCLC 26116335. Please note other editions vary. Reprinted without original diacritical marks in The key to theosophy being a clear exposition in the form of question and answer of the ethics, science, and philosophy for the study of which the Universal brotherhood and Theosophical society has been founded (Theosophical University Press electronic ed.). Pasadena: The Theosophical Society. 1962. ISBN 978-1-55700-046-0.
- —— (1889). The Key to Theosophy. London: The Theosophical Publishing Company.
- —— (1918) [1892]. Mead, George R. S. (ed.). The theosophical glossary (Reprint of 1st ed.). Los Angeles: Theosophical Publishing Society. OCLC 679877592 https://archive.org/details/theosophicalglos00blav.
- —— (1925). Barker, A. Trevor (ed.). The letters of H.P. Blavatsky to A.P. Sinnett, and other miscellaneous letters. London: T. Fisher Unwin.
- Harrison, Vernon (1997). H. P. Blavatsky and the SPR: an examination of the Hodgson Report of 1885. Pasadena: Theosophical University Press. ISBN 978-1-55700-117-7. Revision of Harrison, Vernon (Apr 1986). "J'accuse. An Examination of the Hodgson Report of 1885". Journal of the Society for Psychical Research. 53 (803). London: 287–310. ISSN 0037-9751.
- Hower, Edward (1995-02-26). "The medium with a message". The New York Times (book review). New York. p. BR13. ISSN 0362-4331.
- Kingsford, Anna Bonus; Maitland, Edward (1919) [1882]. "Appendix xv: The secret of satan". The perfect way: or, the finding of Christ (7th ed.). New York: Macoy Publishing & Masonic Supply. pp. 359–364. hdl:2027/uc2.ark:/13960/t66401z2m. OCLC 681713510. Also reprinted in Kingsford, Anna Bonus; Maitland, Edward (1889). "Lambda or the last of the gods being the secret of satan". "Clothed with the sun": being the book of the illuminations of Anna (Bonus) Kingsford. London: George Redway. pp. 263–269. OCLC 381443.
- Кранстон, С. Л. (1999). Данилов, Леонид Лукьянович (ed.). Е.П. Блаватская: Жизнь и творчество основательницы современного теософского движения (in Russian) (2nd ed.). Рига: Лигатма. ISBN 978-5-7738-0017-0. Translation of Cranston, Sylvia L. (1996). HPB: the extraordinary life and influence of Helena Blavatsky, founder of the modern Theosophical movement.
- Johnson, K. Paul (1994). The Masters Revealed: Madam Blavatsky and Myth of the Great White Brotherhood. Albany, New York: State University of New York Press.
- Newman, Hannah (2005). "Blavatsky, Helena P. (1831–1891)". In Levy, Richard S. (ed.). Antisemitism: a historical encyclopedia of prejudice and persecution. Vol. 1. Santa Barbara: ABC-CLIO. pp. 72–73. ISBN 978-1851094394.
- Melton, J. Gordon, ed. (1990). "New Age Encyclopaedia". New Age Encyclopedia. Farmington Hills, Michigan: Gale Research. ISBN 978-0-8103-7159-0. OL 7980176M.
- Müller, Friedrich M. (May 1893). "Esoteric Buddhism". The Nineteenth Century. 33 (195). London: Sampson Low, Marston: 767–788. ISSN 2043-5290.
- —— (1902) [letter composed 1893-06-10]. "[letter] To Colonel Olcott". In Müller, Georgina A. (ed.). The life and letters of the Right Honourable Friedrich Max Müller. Vol. 2. London [u.a.]: Longmans, Green. pp. 297–299. hdl:2027/uc1.b3334965. OCLC 700634676.
- Nilakant (May 1886). Judge, William Q. (ed.). "Theosophical symbolism". The Path. 1 (2). New York: W. Q. Judge: 51. LCCN 2003221012. Transcribed in "Theosophical symbolism". theosociety.org. Pasadena: The Theosophical Society. Archived from the original on 2008-02-09.
- Randi, James (1997) [1994]. "Blavatsky, Helena Petrovna". An encyclopedia of claims, frauds, and hoaxes of the occult and supernatural: decidedly sceptical definitions of alternative realities. New York: St. Martin's Press. ISBN 978-0312151195. Reprinted in "Blavatsky, Helena Petrovna". randi.org. James Randi Educational Foundation.
- Sellon, Emily (1987). "Blavatsky, H. P.". In Eliade, Mircea; Adams, Charles J. (eds.). The encyclopedia of religion. Vol. 2. New York: Macmillan. pp. 245–246. ISBN 9780029094808.
- "Madame Blavatsky, co-founder of the Theosophical Society, was unjustly condemned, new study concludes" (Press release). London: The Incorporated Society for Psychical Research. 1986-05-08. Archived from the original on 1999-02-02 – via blavatsky.net.
- Wakoff, Michael B. (1998). "Theosophy". In Edward Craig (ed.). Routledge Encyclopedia of Philosophy. Vol. 9. New York: Routledge. pp. 363–366. ISBN 978-0-415-18714-5.
- Zirkoff, Boris de (Winter 1967–1968). "Who played that trick on H.P.B.?: the puzzle of The Theosophical Glossary". Theosophia. 24 (3). Transcribed in Caldwell, Daniel H. (2001-05-11). "Who played that trick on H.P.B.? by Boris de Zirkoff". theos-talk (Mailing list). Archived from the original on 2004-11-20.
