= From the Caves and Jungles of Hindostan =

Book by Helena Blavatsky

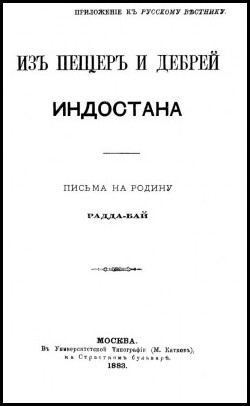
- Title page to the first part (1883)
- Author: Радда-Бай
- Original title: Изъ пещеръ и дебрей Индостана
- Translator: Vera Johnston (1892); Boris de Zirkoff (1975)
- Language: Russian
- Genre: Travel literature
- Publisher: Russky Vyestnik (series)
- Publication date: 1879–1886; separate edition 1883; 1886
- Publication place: Russia
- English publication date: 1892; 1975
- OCLC: 77322017

From the Caves and Jungles of Hindostan: Letters to the Homeland (Pre-reform Russian: «Изъ пеще́ръ и де́брей Индоста́на: пи́сьма на ро́дину»; tr. Iz peshcher i debrei Indostana: pis'ma na rodinu) is a literary work by Helena Blavatsky, the founder of the Theosophical Society. (Note: Blavatsky had been naming her work "my Russian Letters from India.") She published it under the pen name Radda Bai in serial installments (letters) from 1879 to 1886 in Moscow in the periodicals Moskovskiya Vedomosti and Russkiy Vestnik, edited by Mikhail Katkov. The first part of these letters was published in a single volume in 1883 as an appendix to the journal Russkiy Vestnik. (Note: Editor's note: "These letters, belonging to the pen of our countrywoman, were printed at different times in the Moskovskiya Vedomosti over the signature of Radda-Bai and will be continued in the Russkiy Vestnik.) The second part of the letters was published in 1884–1886. The series was never finished as it broke off rather suddenly. (Note: Continuation of the series was not found: see, the end of the last letter.)

== Literary expert's opinion ==
The Russian literary critic Zinaida Vengerova noted that this Blavatsky's book has "somewhat a mystical coloring" due to numerous stories and the author's arguments about the secret wisdom of the Hindus, which does not detract from its literary significance. The close acquaintance of the writer with the Indian sights allows her to be very entertaining to talk about the "most diverse aspects of the life" in modern and ancient India. Simply, "but very artistically," she describes the covering India from immemorial times magnificent buildings, on which the past millenniums had no influence.

"Especially she is being occupied a mysterious sect of raj-yogis, the holy sages, who, through the special exertion of their spiritual forces, something like a long spiritual gymnastics, reach the ability to perform undoubted miracles: so, Blavatsky's personally acquaintance raj-yogi Gulab-Singh (Note: "In Caves and Jungles HPB describes, under the name Gulab-Singh, a figure who corresponds in most details to her descriptions elsewhere of Mahatma Morya.") (Note: Senkevich wrote that in this book Blavatsky introduced under the pseudonym of Gulab-Lal-Singh her Masters Morya and Kuthumi.) had been answering the questions which Blavatsky was demanding only mentally, had been disappearing and appearing completely unexpectedly for everyone, had been opening to them in the mountains the mysterious entrances through which they were entering the marvelous underground temples, etc." (Note: Blavatsky wrote to Sinnett: "It is like my Russian Letters from India, where while describing a fictitious journey or tour through India with Thornton's Gazeteer as my guide, I yet give there true facts and true personages only bringing in together within three or four months time, facts and events scattered all throughout years as some of Master's phenomena." Nevertheless Neff noted that "colonel Olcott wrote in the margins of his copy of From the Caves and Jungles of Hindostan the words: 'The Master has been not seen.'")

== Indologist's comments ==
Senkevich wrote that these essays by Blavatsky had a "stunning success" in Russia. He stated that Blavatsky demonstrates in this work an enviable erudition and liveliness of the mind. In a sense, her book is a country-specific encyclopaedia, which and "to this day has not lost its scientific value." (Note: Senkevich claimed that in the book, for example, correctly described the tree serpents, or the shrubby snakes, abundantly found in the jungles of Bengal: "As soon as the head of a man comes under the branch which shelters this 'enemy of mankind,' the snake, coiling its tail around the branch, dives full length into space and strikes the man on his forehead.") The author's desire to disclose India "from within," through people with whom she was throwed by her fate, gives the book, in comparison with the usual travel essays, a "special, completely new character of the psychological document reflecting many facets of the Indian spiritual world, the specificity of the life of traditional Indian society." The book gives also an objective assessment of the English colonial rule, all the more important because it contains the condemnation of the Englishmen living in India, despite the "truthful, depressing descriptions of atrocities" against them by the participants the Sepoy uprising (1857–1859).

According to Senkevich, Blavatsky expresses her indignation at the English colonial orders, contempt for the pleasures and amusements of the British officials and the Anglo-Indians, who served them, "in a sarcastic and vitriolic manner," and the reader, empathizing with her "violent emotions, willy-nilly takes her side." She took into account the stereotypes of the average Russian reader's thinking, his "phobias, geopolitical views and cultural predilections." Here is one example of her emotional reasoning on the subject of the English suspiciousness and jealousy:

"This national characteristic of the English to shout: 'Help, they are killing us!' when nobody even thinks of touching them, is disgusting… But if this trait is notable even in England, how much more so is it in India? Here suspicion has become a monomania. Anglo-Indians see Russian spies even in their own shoes, and this drives them to madness… They watch every new arrival from one province to another, even should he be an Englishman. People have been deprived not only of every weapon, but of all knives and axes. The peasant can hardly chop his wood, or protect himself from a tiger. But the English are still afraid. It is true that here there are but 60,000 of them, while the native population numbers 245 million. And their system which they took over from successful animal-tamers, is good only until the animal senses his tamer is fearful in his turn… Then his hour has come! At all events, such a manifestation of chronic fear merely admits a recognition of one's own weakness."

== Criticism ==
Vera Johnston, the first translator of the work, wrote that author's manuscript "was often incorrect; often obscure." The Russian editors, though they did their best to transfer faithfully the Indian names and places, "often produced, through their ignorance of Oriental tongues, forms which are strange, and sometimes unrecognizable."

"The proof-sheets were never corrected by the author, who was then in India; and, in consequence, it has been impossible to restore all the local and personal names to their proper form. A similar difficulty has arisen with reference to quotations and cited authorities, all of which have gone through a double process of refraction: first into Russian, then into English."

Solovyov noted that Blavatsky was in her lifetime very troubled that the English should not know contents of the book, "as she wrote for Russian readers, and was not sparing of ridicule and censure against the Anglo-Indian Government and its representatives." He claimed also that the reader of the book must look on it as "romance and fancy, and must on no account take on trust the facts and statements" given by Blavatsky because "most bitter disenchantment awaits the too trustful reader." Murphet wrote that Blavatsky's work is "a highly imaginative concoction of fact-and-fiction, written in a style that established her literary reputation with Russian editors."

According to Senkevich, in the 1870s and 1880s, a lot of materials appeared in Russian magazines and newspapers, the keynote being the "idea of a Russian war campaign to India." The writer's fame of Blavatsky has been created in the "wake of this propaganda hype."

== Interesting facts ==
- Count Witte has remembered: "She [his cousin Helena Blavatsky] had, no doubt, a literary talent. The Moscow editor, Katkov, famous in the annals of Russian journalism, spoke to me in the highest terms of praise about her literary gifts, as evidenced in the tales entitled From the Jungles of Hindustan, which she contributed to his magazine, The Russian Messenger."
- To solve problem of transcription and transliteration of some theosophical terms when working on a new translation into Russian of The Secret Doctrine the translator Bazyukin applied the method used by Blavatsky in her book From the Caves and Jungles of Hindostan.
- The translator Zaytsev used "wherever possible" in his translation into Russian of The Key to Theosophy "for maintaining the accuracy of the transfer of ideas" some fragments of the book From the Caves and Jungles of Hindostan (see, the translator's note).

== Translations and new editions ==
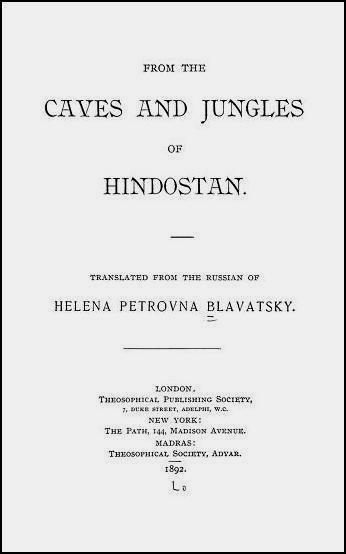
The first English edition (1892)

This work has been translated into English two times. The first translation appeared in 1892 in London but was not complete. It was done by Vera Johnston, Blavatsky's niece. A new 1975 translation by Boris de Zirkoff (also Blavatsky's relative) is now available in author's Collected Writings series. Subsequently, the book was repeatedly reprinted, in English, Russian and Spanish. (Note: The first Spanish edition was a translation from English published by Mario Roso de Luna.) (Note: "24 editions published between 1892 and 2013 in 3 languages and held by 64 WorldCat member libraries worldwide.")

== Publications ==
- From the Caves and Jungles of Hindostan. Translated by Johnston, Vera. London: Theosophical Publishing Society. 1892. OCLC 458567156.
- From the Caves and Jungles of Hindostan, 1883–1886. Blavatsky: Collected writings. Translated by de Zirkoff, B. Wheaton, Ill.: Theosophical Publishing House. 1975. ISBN 9780835602198. OCLC 988188695.

In Russian

- Изъ пещеръ и дебрей Индостана, ч. 1 [From the Caves and Jungles of Hindostan, part 1] (in Russian) (Приложение к журналу ed.). Москва: Университетская типография. 1883. OCLC 38698983.
- Изъ пещеръ и дебрей Индостана, ч. 2 [From the Caves and Jungles of Hindostan, part 2] (in Russian) (Приложение к журналу ed.). Москва: Университетская типография. 1886.
- Изъ пещеръ и дебрей Индостана [From the Caves and Jungles of Hindostan] (in Russian). СПб.: Типография А. С. Суворина. 1912. OCLC 77322017.
- Из пещер и дебрей Индостана [From the Caves and Jungles of Hindostan] (in Russian). Послесловие А. Н. Сенкевича (Репринт 1912 ed.). Москва: ИПО "Автор". 1991 [1912]. ISBN 9785852120014. OCLC 27322334.

In Spanish

- Por las grutas y selvas del Indostán [From the Caves and Jungles of Hindostan] (in Spanish). Madrid: Pueyo. 1918. OCLC 433712114.
- Por cuevas y selvas del Indostán [From the Caves and Jungles of Hindostan] (in Spanish). Valencia: Nueva Acrópolis. 1993. ISBN 8485982444. OCLC 920201583.

== See also ==
- How Theosophy Came to Me
- Incidents in the Life of Madame Blavatsky
- The Occult World
- Theosophy and Hinduism
- Theosophy and literature
