= The Occult World =

1881 book by A. P. Sinnett

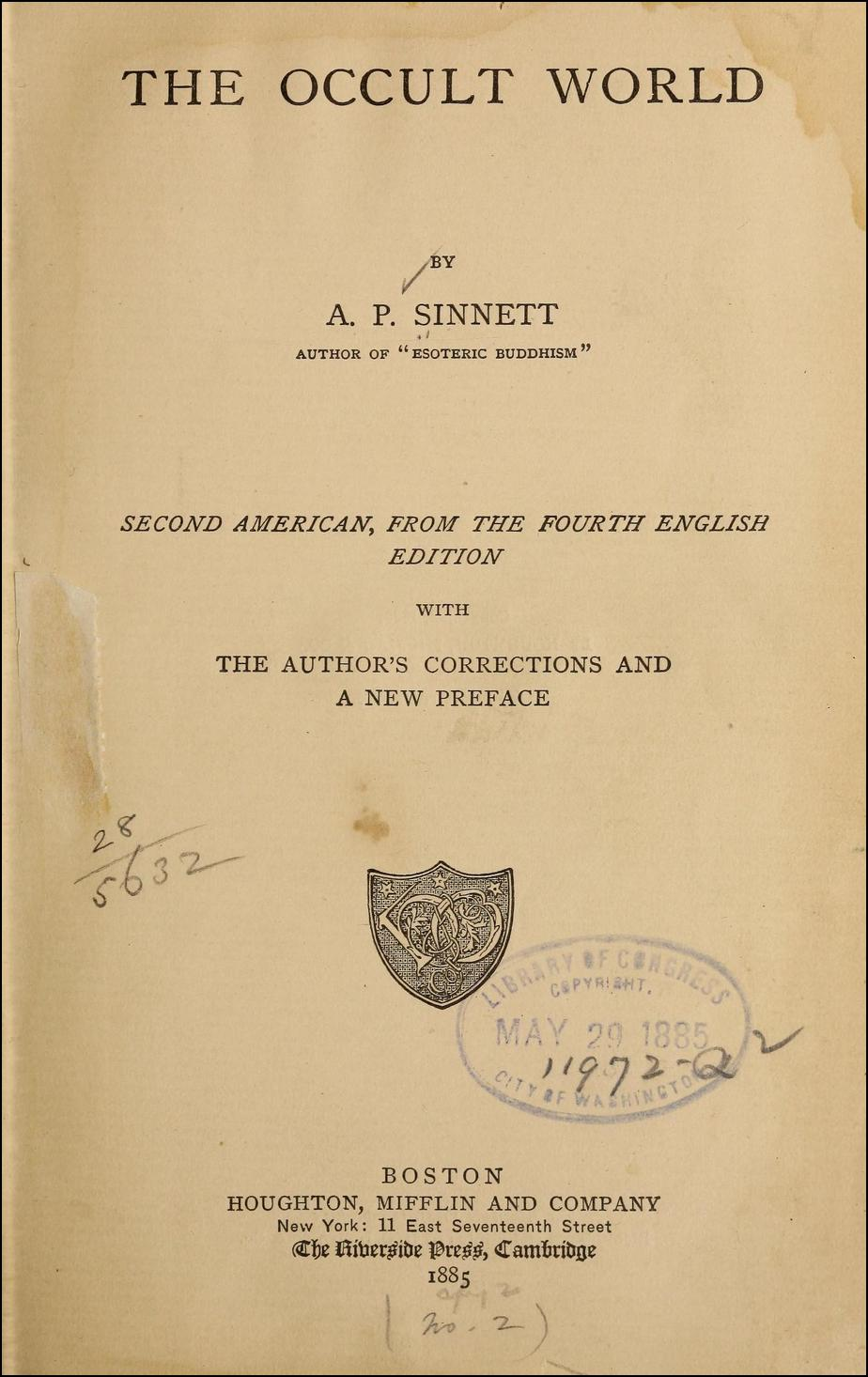
- 2nd American edition, 1885
- Author: A. P. Sinnett
- Language: English
- Subject: Theosophy
- Publisher: Trübner & Co
- Publication date: 1881 (1st edition)
- Publication place: United Kingdom
- Pages: 172
- OCLC: 20697259
- Text: The Occult World at Wikisource

The Occult World is a book originally published in 1881 in London; it was compiled by a member of the Theosophical Society, A. P. Sinnett. It was the first theosophical work by the author; according to Goodrick-Clarke, this book "gave sensational publicity to Blavatsky's phenomena" and the letters from the mahatmas, and drew the attention of the London Society for Psychical Research. (Note: Kuhn wrote that this book by Sinnett "was the first direct statement to the West of the existence of the Masters and their activity as sponsors for the Theosophical Society." In his opinion, the author convincingly took over the major objective of confirming the "surpassing knowledge and sublime wisdom" of these "supermen.")

== History of compilation and publication ==
In September and October 1880 Blavatsky and Olcott visited Sinnett at Simla. (Note: P. Washington wrote that Blavatsky had been in sincere friendship with Sinnett and his wife Patience.) Sinnett expressed serious interest in the work and teachings of the Theosophical Society, and it prompted Blavatsky help him into contact and correspondence with two adepts who sponsored the Society, the mahatmas Kuthumi and Morya. (Note: Goodrick-Clarke wrote that "the very concept of the Masters" is the Rosicrucian idea of "invisible and secret adepts, working for the advancement of humanity." And Tillett stated: "The concept of Masters or Mahatmas as presented by HPB involved a mixture of western and eastern ideas; she located most of them in India or Tibet. Both she and Colonel Olcott claimed to have seen and to be in communication with Masters. In Western occultism the idea of 'Supermen' has been found in such schools as... the fraternities established by de Pasqually and de Saint-Martin.") He was able to gather the material for his first theosophical book, which was based mostly on his notes of Blavatsky's occult work, and which "made her name widely known, though it contained nothing from her pen."

In the second half of 1880, Anglo-Indian newspaper The Pioneer published several individual and collective reports of witnesses of Blavatsky's occult phenomena, in particular on 7 November 1880 a report which was written by Sinnett himself. In 1881, he incorporated these reports into his book. In February 1881 Kuthumi, writing that he is interested in Sinnett's book and its success, gave permission to use his letters: "I lay no restrictions upon your making use of anything I may have written to you..., having full confidence in your tact and judgment as to what should be printed and how it should be presented." In March 1881 the Sinnetts went on vacation to England, expecting to find a publisher for The Occult World. (Note: 1 March 1881 Kuthumi wished Sinnett to return from Europe "with a good book" in his hand.) The book was published in June 1881 during the author's stay in London. In July 1881 Sinnett returned to India, and on the next day after the arrival he received a letter in which Kuthumi congratulated him on the publication. Kuthumi wrote: "When the first hum and ding-dong of adverse criticism is hushed, thoughtful men will read and ponder over the book."

The book is dedicated by author "to the Mahatma Koot Hoomi whose gracious friendship has given the present writer his title to claim the attention of the European world."

== Contents of the book ==
Introduction.
Occultism and its Adepts.
The Theosophical Society.
First Occult Experiences.
Teachings of Occult Philosophy.
Later Occult Phenomena.
Appendix.

=== Occult philosophy ===
The book begins with the author's allegation that there is a school of thought which modern culture has forgotten, and that the metaphysics, and to a large degree the present physical science, "have been groping for centuries blindly after knowledge which occult philosophy has enjoyed in full measure all the while." Sinnett takes the liberty to express his belief that his knowledge is certainly true. He argues:

"I have come into some contact with persons who are heirs of a greater knowledge concerning the mysteries of Nature and humanity than modern culture has yet evolved... Modern science has accomplished grand results by the open method of investigation, and is very impatient of the theory that persons who ever attained to real knowledge, either in sciences or metaphysics, could have been content to hide their light under a bushel... But there is no need to construct hypotheses in the matter. The facts are accessible if they are sought for in the right way."

Sinnett explains that "the ultimate development" of an occultist requires him to comply with "absolute physical purity." The candidate is obliged from the beginning to provide evidence that he is willing to comply with this requirement. Throughout the trial period, he should observe complete celibacy, and to refrain from all physical pleasures. However, this way of life does not presuppose any particular rigid discipline or hard asceticism, or "withdrawal from the world." The author says:

"There would be nothing to prevent a gentleman in ordinary society from being in some of the preliminary stages of training for occult candidature without anybody about him being the wiser. For true occultism, the sublime achievement of the real adept, is not attained through the loathsome asceticism of the ordinary Indian fakir, the yogi of the woods and wilds, whose dirt accumulates with his sanctity—of the fanatic who fastens iron hooks into his flesh, or holds up an arm until it is withered."

=== Occult correspondence ===
On 29 September 1880 during an evening walk with Mrs. Sinnett, Blavatsky, responding to the suddenly expressed desire of her companion to get a little note from one of the "Brothers", tore off a corner of a letter received that day, and held it in her hand until it disappeared. Then Blavatsky asked her to specify where there should be a note. Mrs. Sinnett pointed to a tree, and then among its branches, she found the same corner of the paper, but now it contained a brief message written in English and signed in Tibetan symbols.
According to Barborka, this note was the first message of the mahatmas, which had come in response to an oral request, and after it Sinnett decided to write his first letter to the "Unknown Brother." (Note: This note is stored in the department of rare manuscripts of the British Library. Barborka wrote: "The folds of the paper and holes made when the note was pinned onto the twig are clearly visible.") The author says:

"One day, therefore, I asked Madame Blavatsky whether if I wrote a letter to one of the Brothers explaining my views, she could get it delivered for me. I hardly thought this was probable, as I knew how very unapproachable the Brothers generally are; but as she said that at any rate she would try, I wrote a letter, addressing it 'to the Unknown Brother', and gave it to her to see if any result would ensue. It was a happy inspiration that induced me to do this, for out of that small beginning has arisen the most interesting correspondence in which I have ever been privileged to engage." (Note: Hammer noted that between 1880 and 1884 Sinnett received from the mahatmas circa one hundred twenty letters. Kuhn wrote: "Sinnett was the channel of transmission, and to him the two Masters sent a long series of letters on philosophical and other subjects, they themselves remaining in the background.")

=== Occult phenomena ===
During Blavatsky's first visit to the Sinnetts' house at Allahabad, they were able to observe, in addition to the raps, one more phenomenon. For a few days they had gone with their guest to Benares, where they had settled at a house which had been lent by the maharaja of Vizianagaram. One evening after dinner, they sat in the great hall of the house. "Suddenly three or four flowers – cut roses – fell" right between them. (Note: Guénon wrote that the many theosophical phenomena can be found in a book by Sinnett The Occult World, which mentions the following things: "knocking at will, tingling of invisible bells, the carrying and 'materialization' of all sorts of objects, and above all, 'precipitation' of letters sent by 'astral' means.")

At Simla a picnic was planned, and a group of six men had intended to go into the forest. The supplies were designed for six men, but a seventh person suddenly joined the group. In preparation for the midday meal, the lack of a coffee cup and saucer was revealed. Someone jestingly suggested to Blavatsky to materialize the additional cup. Blavatsky held a "mental conversation" with one of her outlying "Brothers" and then pointed to a specific place, overgrown with grass and bushes. One of the participants began to dig there with a knife. After some time a white object was found, which was a tea-cup, and near it was a saucer, and as such they were no different from the other six cups and saucers brought from the Sinnetts' house. Plant roots around the utensils were found intact, and it has reportedly been proved that no one pre-dug there. When Mrs. Sinnett reached the house she counted the cups and saucers of this design and found one extra cup and saucer. However, it was impossible to buy such utensils at Simla. (Note: Olcott stated about the phenomenon with a tea-cup: "To complete this part of my narrative, I will state that Mrs. Sinnett and I, reaching the house first, on the return of our party, went straight to the butler's pantry, and found the three other cups of the nine which she had left of the original dozen, put away on an upper shelf with their handles broken, and otherwise dilapidated. The seventh cup produced at the picnic had, therefore, not formed pan [sic] of her broken set.") (Note: Sinnett's reports on Blavatsky's phenomena at Simla "were the cause of much of the misunderstanding and suffering she had to endure for the rest of her life." Nonetheless, Hall stated: "Madam Blavatsky's greatest 'miracles' are her books, and by her writings she is elevated far beyond the reach of her calumniators. Her literary accomplishments and not materialized tea-cups are the hallmark of her genius.")
This outing had one more event, when it turned out that they could not make coffee because all the water bottles were empty, and the water in the nearest stream was dirty. Their servants, sent to the brewery, were unable to get water. Then Blavatsky put the empty bottle into one of the baskets, and then pulled it out, already filled with clean water. (Note: The major disciple of Kuthumi known as the "Disinherited" made a postscript to the letter of his Master: "The bottle filled with water I filled with my own hand—was one of the four only that the servants had in the baskets.")

During another outing occurred the "incident with pillow." Blavatsky turned to Sinnett with the question of where he would like to find a thing that Kuthumi is going to send. Sinnett decided to choose the most inconvenient place and pointed to one of several cushions, but at the insistence of his wife, he chose another. Once the firmly sewn pillow was ripped, they found among the feathers a note from Kuthumi and the brooch, which Mrs. Sinnett left at home. (Note: "The skilled occultist is able to shift his consciousness from one to another plane of manifestation. In short, his control over the vibrational energies of the Akasha makes him veritably lord of all the physical creation.")

"While the letters [from the mahatmas] are the most valuable portion of the book", the most likely cause of its widespread popularity was the occult phenomena described by the author, which he observed personally. (Note: Lavoie wrote that The Occult World contains a description of the various phenomena, which were performed by Blavatsky in the presence of the author. Johnson noted that while staying in the author's home, Blavatsky "performed an astounding series of paranormal phenomena" which were reported in The Occult World.)

== Criticism ==
Guénon wrote that Sinnett, who "at the beginning probably contributed more than anybody else to make Theosophism known in Europe, was genuinely fooled by all of Mme Blavatsky's tricks." In the Hodgson Report Blavatsky's phenomena described in the book by Sinnett are discussed in a section "The Occult World Phenomena". At the end of this section, Hodgson claimed:

"I think I am justified in saying that the phenomena relied upon by Mr. Sinnett in The Occult World can be accounted for much more satisfactorily than can the performances of any ordinary professional conjurer by the uninitiated observer, however acute; that the additional details which I have been enabled to furnish in connection with some of the incidents Mr. Sinnett has recorded, clearly show that he has not been in the habit of exercising due caution for the exclusion of trickery; and that he has not proceeded in accordance with those 'scientific modes of investigation' which he explicitly declares (Occult World, p. 35) he regarded as necessary for the task he attempted."

Solovyov (with irony in relation to Sinnett) stated that from the analysis of the phenomena described in The Occult World in the Hodgson Report, "we can draw a conclusion: what a 'serious and honest' researcher we are dealing with in the case of Mr. Sinnett, this 'famous apostle' of the modern Theosophy and main defender of H. P. Blavatsky." Nevertheless, according to Goodrick-Clarke, "a thorough analysis of the Hodgson Report by Vernon Harrison of the SPR effectively demolished... the conclusions of the Report."

An American Spiritualist Henry Kiddle addressed in 1883 in a London spiritualist magazine Light letter to the editor, in which he said that after reading Sinnett's book The Occult World, he was "very greatly surprised," when he discovered that one of Kuthumi's letters published in the book contains text which "was for the most part quite simply the copy of a lecture", which he made at Lake Pleasant 15 August 1880, and published the same month in Banner of Light. In this connection, Kiddle asked: "As Mr. Sinnett's book did not appear till a considerable time afterwards (about a year, I think), it is certain that I did not quote, consciously or unconsciously, from its pages. How, then, did it get into Kuthumi's mysterious letter?"
According to Guénon, "the Professor Kiddle incident" was the first strike to hit the Theosophical Society overtly. He wrote that Sinnett has presented in the fourth edition of The Occult World "a rather awkward explanation", which came from Kuthumi himself. (Note: In December 1883 Sinnett received from the mahatma a clarification on the matter, and it was published in an appendix to the fourth edition of The Occult World.) Kuthumi stated that what looked like plagiarism was due to the awkwardness and carelessness of a pupil. The "Master" was forced to admit that he was negligent when he allowed his letter to be sent without checking and correction. He has written so:

"The letter in question was framed by me while on a journey and on horseback. It was dictated mentally in the direction of and precipitated by a young chela not yet expert at this branch of psychic chemistry, and who had to transcribe it from the hardly visible imprint. Half of it, therefore, was omitted, and the other half more or less distorted by the 'artist'. When asked by him at the time whether I would look over and correct it, I answered—imprudently, I confess—'Anyhow will do, my boy; it is of no great importance if you skip a few words.' I was physically very tired by a ride of forty-eight hours consecutively, and (physically again) half asleep. Besides this, I had very important business to attend to psychically, and therefore little remained of me to devote to that letter. When I awoke I found it had already been sent on, and as I was not then anticipating its publication, I never gave it from that time a thought... Yet had I dictated my letter in the form it now appears in print, it would certainly look suspicious, and however far from what is generally called plagiarism, yet in the absence of any inverted commas it would lay a foundation for censure. But I did nothing of the kind, as the original impression now before me clearly shows." (Note: "When a Mr. Henry Kiddle, an American lecturer on Spiritualism, accused the writer of the Mahatma Letters of having plagiarized whole passages from his lecture delivered at Mt. Pleasant, New York, in 1880, a year prior to the publication of The Occult World, the Master K.H. explained in a letter to Mr. Sinnett that the apparent forgery of words and ideas came about through a bit of carelessness on his part in the precipitation of his ideas through a chela. While dictating the letter to the latter, he had caught himself 'listening in' on Mr. Kiddle's address being delivered at the moment in America; and as a consequence the chela took down portions of the actual lecture as reflected from the mind of K.H.")

== New editions and translations ==
After its first publication in 1881 the book was reprinted several times: in 1882 came the 2nd edition, in 1883 – 3rd, 1913 – 9th. This work has been translated into several European languages: French, German, Dutch, Swedish, Finnish, and Russian. (Note: "77 editions published between 1881 and 2015 in 6 languages and held by 290 WorldCat member libraries worldwide.")

== See also ==
- Buddhism and Theosophy
- Esoteric Buddhism
- From the Caves and Jungles of Hindostan
- Incidents in the Life of Madame Blavatsky
- Mahatma Letters
