= Incidents in the Life of Madame Blavatsky =

1886 book by A. P. Sinnett

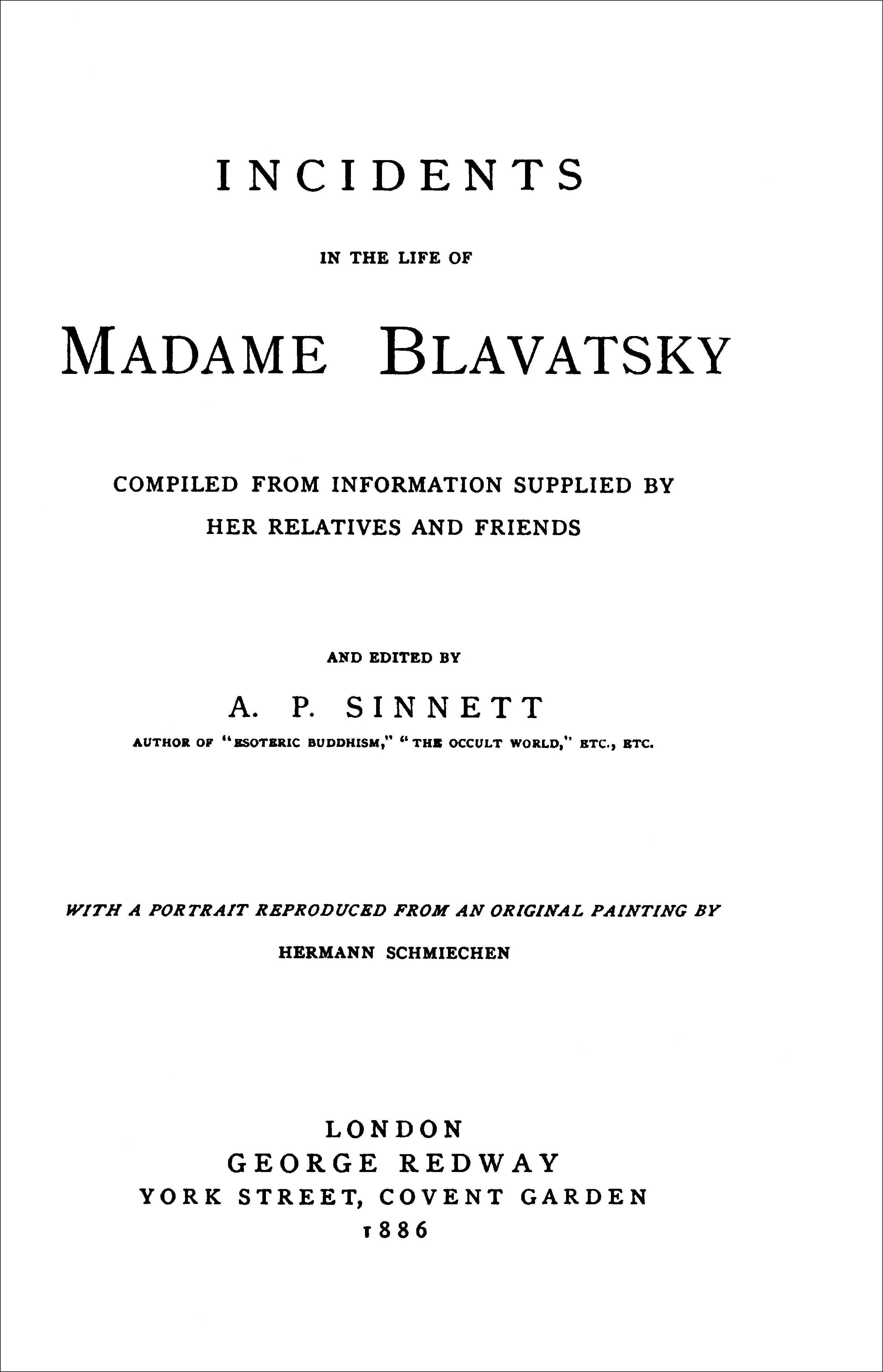
- 1st edition, 1886
- Author: A. P. Sinnett
- Language: English
- Subject: Helena Blavatsky
- Genre: Biography
- Publisher: George Redway
- Publication date: 1886
- Publication place: United Kingdom
- Pages: XII–324
- OCLC: 458880577
- Text: Incidents in the Life of Madame Blavatsky online

Incidents in the Life of Madame Blavatsky: compiled from information supplied by her relatives and friends is a book originally published in 1886 in London; it was compiled by a member of the Theosophical Society, A. P. Sinnett, who was the first biographer of H. P. Blavatsky (née Hahn). Sinnett describes the many unusual incidents in Blavatsky's life beginning from her childhood in Russia, and asserts that Blavatsky had "an early connection with the supernatural world;" Sinnett also writes about Blavatksy's short, unlucky marriage and "decade of extensive global travels," about her period of learning in Tibet, and the "criticism she received about some of her 'phenomena' and practices." (Note: "His (A. P. Sinnett's) book, Incidents in the Life of Madame Blavatsky, has been our chief source of information about her youth and early career.")

== From history of compilation ==
Washington wrote that Blavatsky with Sinnett and his wife Patience have been in sincere friendship, and over a decade (1879–89), she held correspondence with them and supplied to the author the materials for her biography. (Note: "Much of this biography had been derived from Blavatsky herself.") The book was "an attempt to reestablish" Blavatsky's reputation after the attacks of the Society for Psychical Research contained in the Hodgson Report. Sinnett long continued correcting often distorted information about the time and place of the events in the book, having arrived to Blavatsky in Würzburg for it. Subsequently, she continued to send him additional memories. Sinnett wrote: "In consultation we decided that Memoirs would be too comprehensive a title for the book and agreed on the word Incidents instead." In her letter to the author, Blavatsky stated:

"Do whatever you like. Publish the memoirs, write what you think best and proper. I subscribe to it beforehand and hereby give you carte blanche and full authority to act and do in my name whatever you will. I am sure you will defend the cause and myself better than I ever can."

== Contents of the book ==
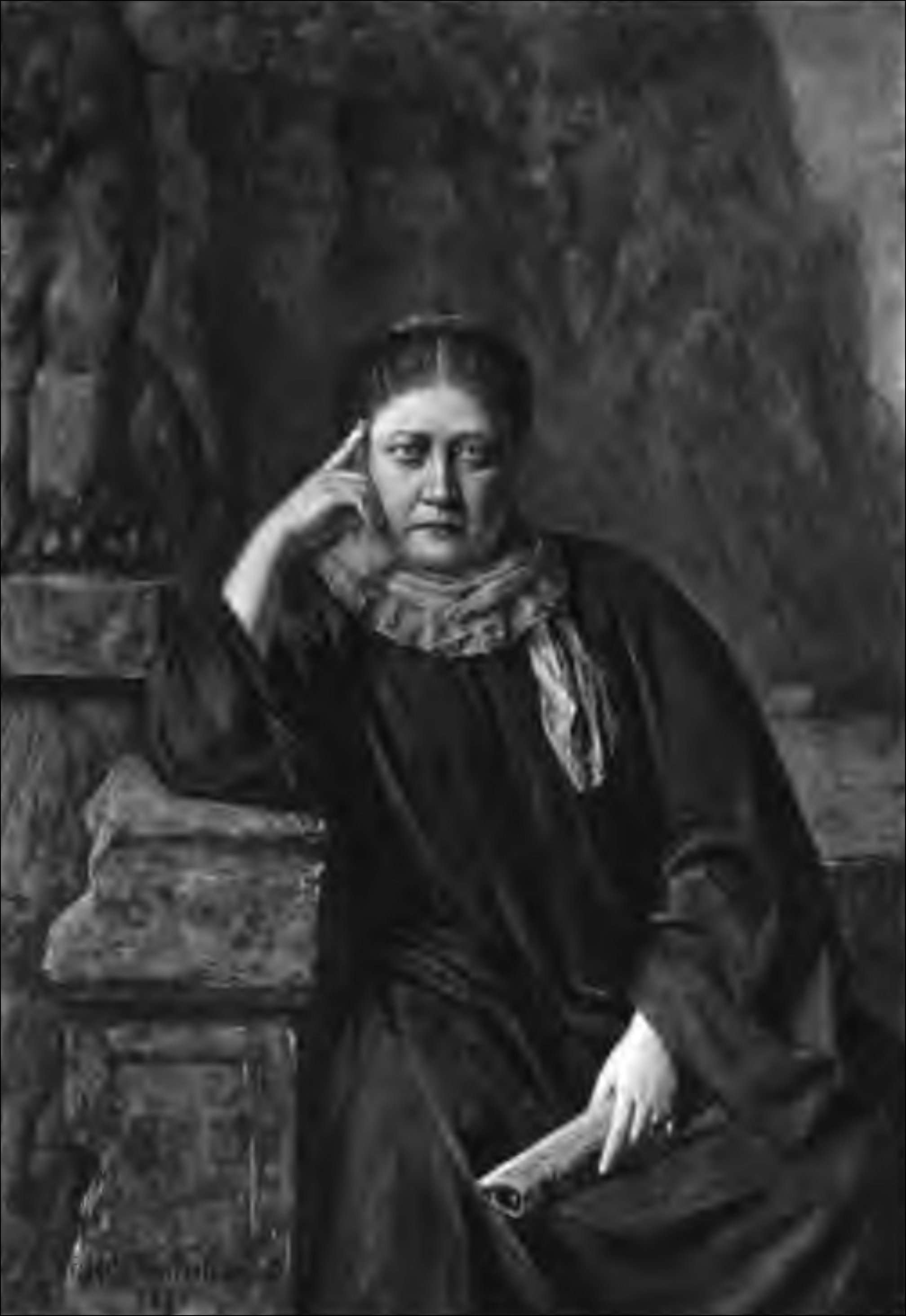
Frontispiece: Mme. Blavatsky (painted by H. Schmiechen).

1. Childhood.
2. Marriage and Travel.
3. At Home in Russia, 1858.
4. Mme. de Jelihowsky's Narrative.
5. Mme. de Jelihowsky's Narrative—continued.
6. Mme. de Jelihowsky's Narrative—continued.
7. From Apprenticeship to Duty.
8. Residence in America.
9. Established in India.
10. A Visit to Europe.

=== Childhood ===
Helena told her biographer about a strange event that happened to her in early childhood. She wanted to get a better look at a portrait hanging high on the wall. She made a pyramid out of two small tables and one chair, and tried to get to the portrait. What happened next, she does not know, because she lost consciousness at the moment when her building swayed and began to crumble. When she regained consciousness, she saw herself completely intact on the floor, and the tables and chair were again in their usual places. Nevertheless, "the mark of her small hand remained imprinted on the dusty wall high up beside the picture."

The author tells about another case where Helena miraculously survived: "A horse bolted with her — she fell, with her foot entangled in the stirrup, and before the horse was stopped she ought, she thinks, to have been killed outright but for a strange sustaining power she distinctly felt around her, which seemed to hold her up in defiance of gravitation." She was then fourteen years old. Sinnett informs that, according to her earliest memories, she occasionally saw near herself her protector. From early childhood, this form has prevailed in her imagination. He was always the same, his features never changed. "In after life she met him as a living man, and knew him as though she had been brought up in his presence." (Note: Senkevich wrote that after a few years "she will find him in the London crowd, and he will become her Master." According to Goodrick-Clarke, "in August 1851 she (Blavatsky) first met with her 'Master'." Goodrick-Clarke wrote that "the very concept of the Masters" is the Rosicrucian idea of "invisible and secret adepts, working for the advancement of humanity." And Tillett stated: "The concept of Masters or Mahatmas as presented by HPB involved a mixture of western and eastern ideas; she located most of them in India or Tibet. Both she and Colonel Olcott claimed to have seen and to be in communication with Masters. In Western occultism the idea of 'Supermen' has been found in such schools as... the fraternities established by de Pasqually and de Saint-Martin.")

A certain seer told about Helena's future:

"This little lady is quite different from all of you. There are great events lying in wait for her in the future. I feel sorry in thinking that I will not live to see my predictions of her verified; but they will all come to pass!"

=== Failed marriage ===
According to Helena Hahn's aunt, the reason for this marriage was frivolous nature of her niece. Her governess has said that her character is bad, and hardly there is a man who would be willing to marry her. To enhance the impact of her words the governess added that "even the old man she had found so ugly, and had laughed at so much, calling him 'a plume-less raven' — that even he would decline her for a wife! That was enough: three days after she made him (Mr. Blavatsky) propose, and then, frightened at what she had done, sought to escape from her joking acceptance of his offer. But it was too late." Helena's aunt has described:

"At the altar, she heard the priest saying to her: 'Thou shalt honour and obey thy husband', and at this hated word 'shalt,' her young face — for she was hardly seventeen — was seen to flush angrily, then to become deadly pale. She was overheard to mutter in response, through her set teeth — 'Surely, I shall not.'"
[Sinnett continues:] "And surely she has not. Forthwith she determined to take the law and her future life into her own hands, and — he left her 'husband' for ever, without giving him any opportunity to ever even think of her as his wife."

Sinnett says that Mr. Blavatsky himself was ready to agree in the divorce. He tried to get a formal divorce on the reason that "his marriage had never been more than a form, and that his wife had run away; but Russian law at the time was not favourable to divorce, and the attempt failed."

Next Blavatsky (Hahn) has left Russia and voyaged "ten long years in strange and out-of-the-way places — in Central Asia, India, South America, Africa, and Eastern Europe."

=== Occult phenomena in Russia ===
Blavatsky's unusual psychic abilities, that had manifested even in her childhood and adolescence, during her travel significantly increased and determined, and she returned to Russia, having many occult powers. In the town of Pskoff Blavatsky had performed occult phenomena under follows classification:

1. Direct and perfectly clear written and verbal answers to mental questions — or "thought-reading".
2. Prescriptions for different diseases, in Latin, and subsequent cures.
3. Private secrets, unknown to all but the interested party, divulged, especially in the case of those persons who mentioned insulting doubts.
4. Change of weight in furniture and of persons at will. (Note: "The perfections (siddhis) are attained through birth, drugs (oadhi), spells (mantras), austerity (tapas), or concentration (samadhi).")
5. Letters from unknown correspondents, and immediate answers written to queries made, and found in the most out-of-the-way mysterious places.
6. Appearances and apport of objects unclaimed by any one present.
7. Sounds as of musical notes in the air wherever Mme. Blavatsky desired they should resound. (Note: Guénon wrote that the theosophical phenomena were the following: "knocking at will, tingling of invisible bells, the carrying and 'materialization' of all sorts of objects, and above all, 'precipitation' of letters sent by 'astral' means.")

One time Blavatsky had caused raps inside the glasses of a skeptical professor with such force that they were knocked from his nose. In reply to a somewhat frivolous lady who had asked what is the best conductor for the production of such raps, the table spelt out 'gold', and the next minute this lady rushed out of the room with her hands inflicted on her mouth, as she had felt the raps on her gold artificial teeth.

Blavatsky has transformed weight of small table so that Leonid Hahn, her brother, couldn't lift it. Then she recovered it to a normal weight, and Leonid raised the table as a feather. Sinnett informs, according to Jelihowsky's narrative:

"At one moment as we sat at supper in the dining-room, there were loud accords played on the piano which stood in the adjoining apartment, and which was closed and locked, and so placed that we could all of us see it from where we were through the large open doors. Then at the first command and look of Mme. Blavatsky there came rushing to her through the air her tobacco-pouch, her box of matches, her pocket-handkerchief, or anything she asked, or was made to ask for."

=== Mediums and mediumship ===
Sinnett tells that Blavatsky has tried with the most prominent mediums to call and "communicate with those dearest to her, and whose loss she had deplored, but could never succeed." She said to him that "she often saw, to her disgust, how her own recollections and brain-images were drawn from her memory and disfigured in the confused amalgamation that took place between their reflection in the medium's brain, which instantly sent them out, and the shells which sucked them in like a sponge and objectivised them." Next Sinnett transmits the following words by Blavatsky:

"Even the materialized form of my uncle at the Eddys was the picture; it was I who sent it out from my own mind, as I had come out to make experiments without telling it to anyone. It was like an empty outer envelope of my uncle that I seemed to throw on the medium's astral body. I saw and followed the process, I knew Will Eddy was a genuine medium, and the phenomenon as real as it could be, and therefore, when days of trouble came for him, I defended him in the papers." (Note: When a professor George Bird published in the newspaper Daily Graphic article in which Eddy brothers were declared frauds, Blavatsky sent to this newspaper her response to Bird.)

According to Jelihowsky, Blavatsky claimed that she is "no medium, but only a mediator between mortals and beings we knew nothing about." In one of her letters to relatives Blavatsky informed that the last remnant of her psycho-physical helplessness has left her and will not return any more. In connection with her mediumship, Sinnett argues that "there, where a less strong nature would have been surely wrecked in the struggle, her indomitable will found somehow or other the means of subjecting the world of the invisibles — to the denizens of which she has ever refused the name of 'spirits' and souls — to her own control." (Note: Washington wrote that Blavatsky's ability to see the features of conventional mediums has allowed to oppose her might to their charlatanism, inadequacy or inactivity.)

== Criticism ==
Although Blavatsky helped provide information to the author, in Sinnett's book there are a "number of errors of fact which have been pointed out by later writers."
Solovyov wrote concerning Sinnett's book the following:

"For the sake of inflation of Blavatsky's fame Sinnett published a book entitled Incidents in the Life of Madame Blavatsky. The book portrays, on the foundation of the most precise evidences, the life of Helena Petrovna. Well, it is not difficult to prove that this book is mainly a collection of stories about something that never happened." (Note: Kalnitsky wrote that, like a charismatic and debatable person, Blavatsky instigated intensive response, both positive and negative, and following opinions have often issued superfluous contempt or "uncritical idolisation." However, separately from such secondary opinions, an even more problematical challenge is that "she herself was consistently revising, retelling, and reinterpreting the narrative of her life, often intentionally exaggerating, omitting, changing, or disguising facts and details for her own private reasons.") (Note: Guénon wrote that Sinnett, who "at the beginning probably contributed more than anybody else to make Theosophism known in Europe, was genuinely fooled by all of Mme. Blavatsky's tricks." Nonetheless, Lavoie claimed: "Much of this biography had been derived from Blavatsky herself; however, Sinnett's history should not be discounted merely on these grounds or for the fact that he was a follower of Blavatsky. Sinnett's personal writings remain remarkably critical of Blavatsky.")

Solovyov stated that from the analysis of the phenomena performed by Blavatsky, which made Hodgson, "we can conclude, with which 'serious and honest' the researcher we deal in the face of Mr. Sinnett, this 'famous apostle' of the modern theosophy and main defender of H. P. Blavatsky." Solovyov also stated that the theosophical "Universal Brotherhood" is only a "funny bunch of systematic deceptions, as say the modern Frenchmen – rien qu'une fumisterie." He wrote that the conclusions of the SPR about "Blavatsky's phenomena make superfluous the assumption that, in addition to the tricks, she could to demonstrate for the benefit of the theosophy some really exceptional psychic abilities." Hodgson in his report argued:

"Mr. Sinnett treats with scorn the supposition that Madame Blavatsky could have produced either the 'raps' or the 'astral bells' by means of any machine concealed about her person; but I cannot help thinking that the latter sounds at least might have been produced in this way. Madame Coulomb asserts that they were actually so produced, by the use of a small musical-box, constructed on the same principle as the machine employed in connection with the trick known under the name 'Is your watch a repeater?' and she produced garments which she asserted had belonged to Madame Blavatsky, and showed me stains resembling iron-mould on the right side, slightly above the waist, which she affirmed had been caused by contact with the metal of the machine." (Note: However Washington wrote: "She (Mme. Coulomb) was a haughty, vengeful and quarrelsome bitch, and a petty thief who was not above siphoning off the housekeeping money. As for Alexis, he lived completely under the thumb of his sharp-tongued and ambitious wife." Also Senkevich wrote: "Mme. Coulomb was trying to blackmail the members of the Council of governors in Adyar by some notes incriminated to Blavatsky. She demanded money, threatening with the publication of these notes.") (Note: H. P. Blavatsky "was a powerful rapping medium.")

Nevertheless, according to Goodrick-Clarke, "a thorough analysis of the Hodgson Report by Vernon Harrison of the SPR effectively demolished both the Coulomb accusations and the conclusions of the Report."

== New editions and translations ==
The book was reprinted several times and has been translated into French. (Note: "37 editions published between 1886 and 2013 in English and French and held by 356 WorldCat member libraries worldwide.") Second edition of the book was published in 1913 in abridged form. (Note: Murphet stated that 2nd edition of the Incidents in the Life of Madame Blavatsky "is abridged, with many important items eliminated.")

== See also ==
- Esoteric Buddhism
- From the Caves and Jungles of Hindostan
- The Occult World
