= Alfred Percy Sinnett =

English writer and theosophist (1840–1921)

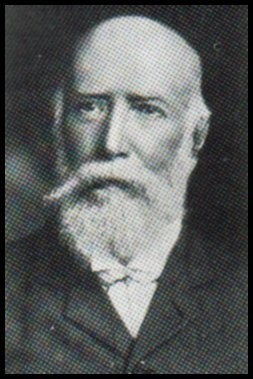
- Born: Alfred Percy Sinnett; 18 January 1840; London, England
- Died: 26 June 1921 (aged 81)
- Occupation: Writer
- Writing career
- Period: 19th century
- Literary movement: Theosophy

Alfred Percy Sinnett (18 January 1840 – 26 June 1921) was an English author and theosophist.

== Biography ==
Sinnett was born in London. His father died while he was young, as in 1851 Sinnett was listed as a "Scholar – London University", living with his mother Jane Sinnett, an author and translator, who is listed as a widow and whose occupation is listed as "Periodical Literature"; his older sister Sophia, age 22, was a teacher. Jane's sister Sarah, age 48, was also a teacher.

In 1870 Sinnett married his wife Patience, probably in the London area. He is listed in the 1871 England Census at age 31, as a Journalist, born in Middlesex. His wife Patience is 27, and her mother Clarissa Edenson a "Landowner", is living with them.

By 1879, Sinnett had moved to India where he was "... the Editor of The Pioneer, the leading English Daily of India..." He relates in his book, The Occult World that: "...on the first occasion of my making Madame Blavatsky's acquaintance she became a guest at my home at Allahabad and remained there for six weeks..."

In 1880 Helena Blavatsky and Henry Steel Olcott visited the Sinnetts at their summer home in Simla. The Mahatma Letters, which generated the controversy that later helped lead to the split of the Theosophical Society were mostly written to Sinnett or his wife Patience. The letters started at this time when Sinnett asked Blavatsky whether if he wrote a letter to her Mahatmas, she could arrange to have it delivered.

By 1884 Sinnett was back in England, where that year Constance Wachtmeister states that she met Blavatsky at the home of the Sinnetts in London.

Sinnett asked Charles Webster Leadbeater to come back to England to tutor his son Percy and George Arundale. Leadbeater agreed and brought with him one of his pupils Curuppumullage Jinarajadasa. Using "astral clairvoyance" Leadbeater assisted William Scott-Elliot to write his book The Story of Atlantis, for which Sinnett wrote the preface.

Sinnett was later president of the London Lodge of the Society.

By 1901 Sinnett is listed as an author. His son Percy is also listed as an author and born in India.

== See also ==
- Quotations related to The Ageless Wisdom Teachings at Wikiquote
- Ascended masters
- Alice Bailey
- Benjamin Creme
- Esoteric Buddhism
- Incidents in the Life of Madame Blavatsky
- Hodgson Report
- Master K.H.
- Master Morya
- K.H. Letters to C.W. Leadbeater
- Mahātmā
- Helena Roerich
- Theosophy and literature#Theosophists as fiction writers
- Agni Yoga
- Theosophy (Blavatskian)

== Works ==
- The Occult World (London: Trubner and Company, 1881)
- Esoteric Buddhism (London: Trubner and Company, 1883). Describes the concept of Root race, later adopted by Madame Blavatsky.
- Karma: A Novel (London: Chapman & Hall, 1885)
- Incidents in the Life of Madame Blavatsky: Compiled from Information Supplied by Her Relatives and Friends (1886)
- The Rationale of Mesmerism (Boston, Houghton, Mifflin and Company, 1892)
- The Growth of the Soul (Theosophical Publishing Society, London and Benares, 1896, 1905)]
- Occult Essays (Theosophical Publishing Society, London and Benares, 1905)
- Married by Degrees; A Play in 3 Acts (London, 1911)
- In the Next World: Actual Narratives of Personal Experiences by Some Who Have Passed On (Theosophical Publishing Society, London, 1914)
- The Spiritual Powers and the War (Theosophical Publishing Society, London, 1915)
- Unseen Aspects of the War: Two Articles by A.P. Sinnett (Theosophical Publishing Society, London, 1916)
- Collected fruits of occult teaching (Philadelphia, 1920)
- Super-Physical Science (Theosophical Publishing Society, London, 1919)
- Tennyson an Occultist, As His Writings Prove (Theosophical Publishing Society, London, 1920)
- The Early Days of Theosophy in Europe (Theosophical Publishing Society, London, 1922) (posthumous)

=== Literature ===
- Autobiography of Alfred Percy Sinnett, Theosophical History Centre Publications, London 1986 ISBN 0-948753-02-1

=== Letters ===
- Helena P. Blavatsky: The letters of H. P. Blavatsky to A. P. Sinnett and other miscellaneous letters, London 1925
- A. Trevor Barker. The Mahatma Letters to A.P. Sinnett London 1926 (ISBN 1-55700-086-7)
