= Frederick Sinnett =

Australian newspaper proprietor

Frederick Sinnett (8 March 1830 – 23 November 1866) was a literary critic and journalist in colonial Australia.

Sinnett was born in Hamburg, Germany, a son of Jane Sinnett, a well-known English author, and was educated for the profession of civil engineer. He went to South Australia in 1849 as engineer to the Adelaide and Port Railway Company; but the scheme was never carried out.

He then went into partnership with Thomas Burr, a former Deputy Surveyor General of South Australia, eventually (in 1857 in Melbourne) marrying Burr's eldest daughter, Jane. During this period he contributed regularly to the Mining Journal, edited by George Stevenson, at that time considered the best-conducted paper in South Australia.

When the Victorian gold fields were discovered in 1851 Sinnett left South Australia for Melbourne, and accepted an engagement as contributor to the Herald, of which paper he became eventually editor and part proprietor. About 1855 he severed his connection with that paper and became a contributor to the Melbourne Argus, with which journal he remained till 1859, with the exception of a short period spent in editing the Daily News at Geelong. About the time that he joined the Argus was commenced the Melbourne Punch, of which journal he was one of the founders, and to the success of which he greatly contributed. In 1859 Sinnett again returned to South Australia to take the management of the Adelaide Ice Works. During his sojourn in South Australia from 1859 to 1865 he founded and edited the evening Telegraph, and was Parliamentary reporter for Hansard. He returned to Melbourne in 1865, where he resumed his connection with the Argus and was retained on the literary staff of that paper as contributor and leader-writer until within a short time of his death on 23 November 1866 in Kew, Melbourne, Victoria, Australia.
