= Esoteric Buddhism (book) =

Book originally published in 1883

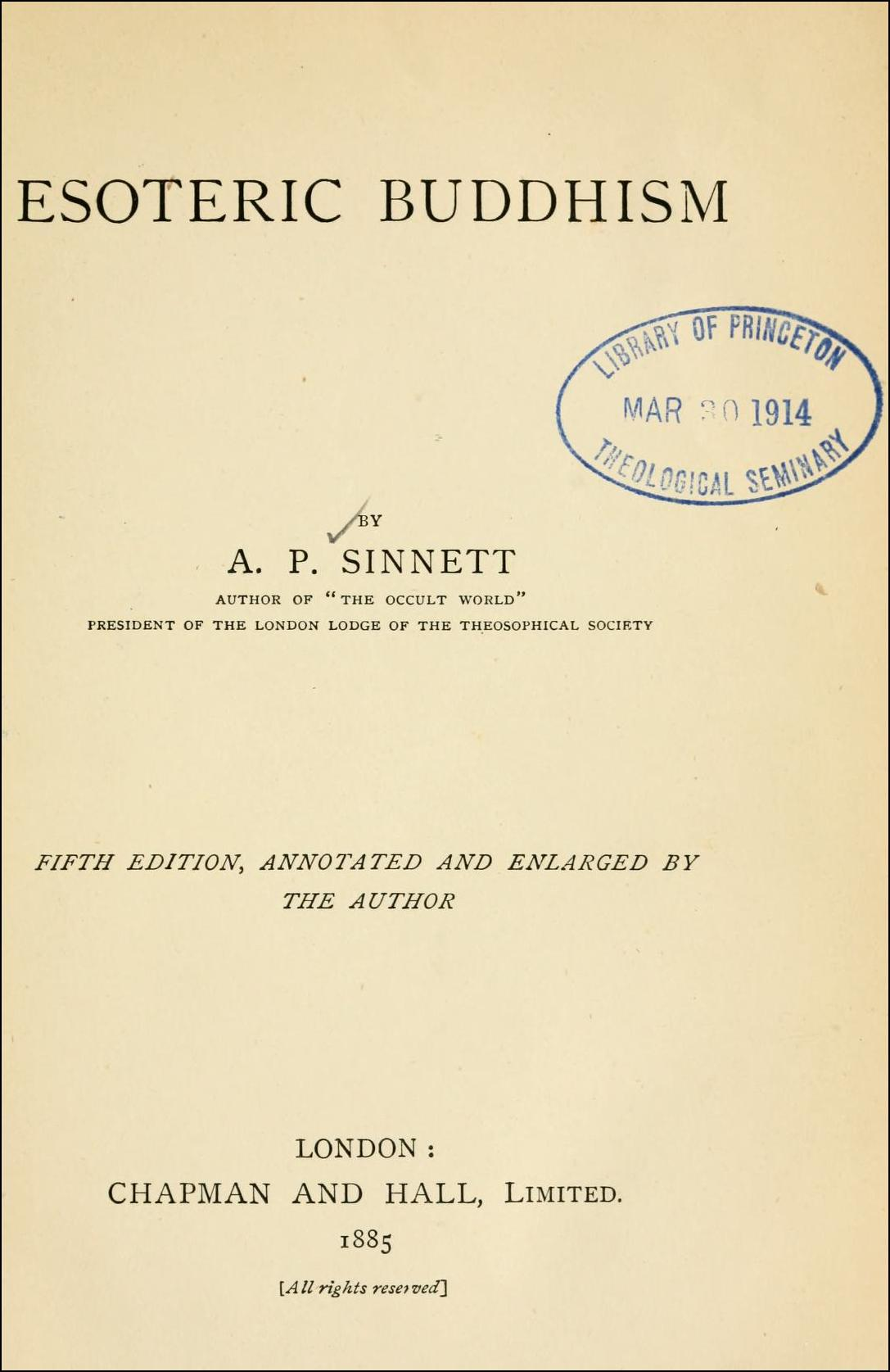
- 5th edition, 1885
- Author: A. P. Sinnett
- Language: English
- Subject: Theosophy
- Publisher: Trübner & Co
- Publication date: 1883 (1st edition)
- Publication place: United Kingdom
- Pages: XX–215
- OCLC: 458880554
- Text: Esoteric Buddhism online

Esoteric Buddhism is a book originally published in 1883 in London; it was compiled by a member of the Theosophical Society, A. P. Sinnett. This is the most significant theosophical work of the author. It was one of the first books written for the purpose of explaining theosophy to the general public, and was "made up of the author's correspondence with an Indian mystic."

Despite the name and purported origin, academics do not believe that the book records traditional Buddhist practices. According to Goodrick-Clarke, it "disseminated the basic teachings of Theosophy in its new Asian cast." (Note: "His [Sinnett's] second book, Esoteric Buddhism, an outline of some of the main teachings of theosophy, attracted much attention and served as a harbinger of H.P.B.'s monumental work, The Secret Doctrine.")

== From history of compilation ==
Through the mediation of Blavatsky (Note: P. Washington wrote that Blavatsky with Sinnett and his wife Patience has been in sincere friendship.) Sinnett began a correspondence in 1880 with the two adepts, who sponsored the Theosophical Society, the mahatmas Kuthumi and Morya. (Note: Goodrick-Clarke wrote that "the very concept of the Masters" is the Rosicrucian idea of "invisible and secret adepts, working for the advancement of humanity." And Tillett stated: "The concept of Masters or Mahatmas as presented by HPB involved a mixture of western and eastern ideas; she located most of them in India or Tibet. Both she and Colonel Olcott claimed to have seen and to be in communication with Masters. In Western occultism the idea of 'Supermen' has been found in such schools as... the fraternities established by de Pasqually and de Saint-Martin.") Hammer noted that between 1880 and 1884 Sinnett received from the mahatmas circa one hundred twenty letters with explanation of "occult cosmology". From this material, he attempted to formulate in his new book "the basis of a revised theosophy." By foundation of the book became "Cosmological notes" received from the Mahatma Morya together with a long series of answers to questions sent by mahatma Kuthumi during the summer of 1882.
Subba Row received from his Master mahatma Morya the instruction to provide assistance to Sinnett in his work on the book, but, according to the memoirs of the author, he did it reluctantly, and with little help. The main help came from the mahatmas through Blavatsky in the form of answers to the questions referred to her by the author.

== Contents of the book ==
1. Esoteric Teachers.
2. The Constitution of Man.
3. The Planetary Chain.
4. The World Periods.
5. Devachan.
6. Kama Loca.
7. The Human Tide-Wave.
8. The Progress of Humanity.
9. Buddha.
10. Nirvana.
11. The Universe.
12. The Doctrine Reviewed.

In preface to the original edition author says that exoteric Buddhism "has remained in closer union with the esoteric doctrine" than any other world religion. Thus, specification of the "inner knowledge" addressed to modern readers will be connected with the familiar features of the Buddhist teaching. Sinnett argues that esoteric teaching "be most conveniently studied in its Buddhist aspect."

=== Esoteric teachers ===
At the beginning of the first chapter the author makes the following statement:

"I am bringing to my readers knowledge which I have obtained by favour (Note: Letters from mahatmas formed the basis of two theosophical books by Sinnett.) rather than by effort. It will not be found the less valuable on that account; I venture, on the contrary, to declare that it will be found of incalculably greater value, easily as I have obtained it, than any results in a similar direction which I could possibly have procured by ordinary methods of research."

On the question of the whereabouts of his teachers Sinnett says that for a long time in Tibet there is a "certain secret region," hitherto unknown and inaccessible to ordinary people and for those living in the surrounding mountains as well as for visitors, "in which adepts have always congregated. But the country generally was not in Buddha's time, as it has since become, the chosen habitation of the great brotherhood. Much more than they are at present, were the Mahatmas in former times, distributed about the world." But the development of civilization has led to the fact that many occultists gathered in Tibet. The system of rules and laws for them has been developed in the 14th century by Tsong-ka-pa.

=== The constitution of man ===
The author argues that "a complete, or perfect man" is made up of seven elements:

1. The Physical Body (Rūpa).
2. Vitality (Prana, or Jiva).
3. Astral Body (Linga Sharira).
4. Animal Soul (Kāma Rūpa).
5. Human Soul (Manas).
6. Spiritual Soul (Buddhi).
7. Spirit (Ātma).

=== The world periods ===
A French philosopher René Guénon stated that the central place of the Theosophical doctrine [which there is in Sinnett's book] is occupied the "idea of evolution." He then wrote that, according to the Theosophical teaching, there are

"seven 'mother-races' succeed one another in the course of a 'world period', that is to say while the 'wave of life' sojourns on a given planet. Each 'race' includes seven 'sub-races', each of which is divided into seven 'branches'. On the other hand, the 'wave of life' successively runs through seven globes in a 'round', and this 'round' is repeated seven times in a same 'planetary chain', after which the 'wave of life' passes to another 'chain', composed likewise of seven planets which will be traversed seven times in their turn. Thus there are seven 'chains' in a 'planetary system', also called an 'enterprise of evolution'; and finally, our solar system is formed of ten 'planetary systems'... We are presently in the fifth 'race' of our 'world period', and in the fourth 'round' of the 'chain' of which the earth forms part and in which it occupies the fourth rank. This 'chain' is also the fourth of our 'planetary system'."

=== Man after death ===
In the fifth chapter of his book, Sinnett explains the fate of man after death. Of the seven components that make up our personality, the three lower at the time of physical death, moving away from us. The four upper components move on Kama loca, and "from there [soul] proceed to Devachan, a kind of theosophical version of heaven." (The analogy should not be carried overly; Sinnett argues that Devachan is a state, not a place.) Then these four components divide themselves, the law of karma specifies that it will happen to them—different souls receive different devachanic experience. Only after a long stay in this state, the soul reincarnates. (Note: "The lower four, or quaternary, are transitory, while the upper triad is related to the eternal element in man, his real nature and identity with the universal soul.") New incarnations on the earth plane are actually rather rare, "but re-birth in less than fifteen hundred years is spoken of as almost impossible."

Sinnett says that the mediums contact with the inhabitants of Devachan, but very rare, and in this time occurs the following:

"The spirit of the sensitive, getting odylized, so to say, by the aura of the spirit in the Devachan, becomes for a few minutes that departed personality, and writes in the handwriting of the latter, in his language and in his thoughts, as they were during his lifetime. The two spirits become blended in one, and the preponderance of one over the other during such phenomena determines the preponderance of personality in the characteristic exhibited. Thus it may incidentally be observed, what is called rapport, is, in plain fact, an identity of molecular vibration between the astral part of the incarnate medium and the astral part of the disincarnate personality."

=== Occult philosophy ===
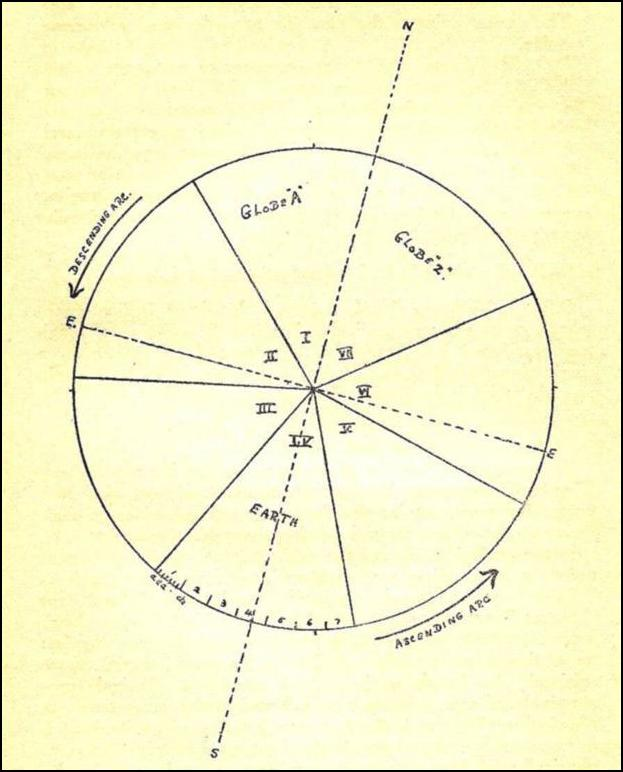
Diagram "Man on a Planet". (Note: "Man evolves in seven major or root-races; 49 minor races; and the subordinate races or offshoots. The arrow indicates the direction taken by the evolutionary impulse. I, II, III, IV, etc., are the seven major or root-races. 1, 2, 3, etc., are the minor races. a, a, a, are the subordinate or offshoot races. N, the initial and terminal point of evolution on the planet. S, the axial point where the development equilibrates or adjusts itself in each race evolution. E, the equatorial points wherein the descending arc intellect overcomes spirituality and in the ascending arc spirituality outstrips intellect. A word or two [globe, earth] added to make it apply as well to a whole manwantaric chain of worlds.")

Lavoie noted that in Sinnett's book there are the two major questions – "the structure of the universe and spiritual evolution." He selected "some key terms" in the book.

Avitchi is a state "of punishment reached only in exceptional cases and by exceptional natures." The usual man will work his karma out in a new incarnation.
Devachan is a state of greatest bliss where "the levels of intensity and the duration of stay are based on the karma one produces in his/her lifetime."
Eighth sphere is a planet associated with our planetary chain that is more materialistic than the earth. The Soul in the mean of the fifth round "can be sent to the eighth sphere for annihilation if it has developed a positive attraction to materialism and a repulsion of spirituality."
Kama loca is "an unconscious state of gestation. It is here that the fourth principle (the animal soul) is separated from the others." The fourth component and some of the fifth component stays in Kama loca while "the rest of the principles continue on in their spiritual evolution." The Ego's duration in Kama loca can last from few moments to years.
Manvantara is a period of activity or manifestation. There are three different manvantaras: 1) the mahamanvantara, 2) the solar manvantara, 3) the minor manvantara.
Monad is upper triad of the seven principles of man (Atma-Buddhi-Manas).
Pralaya is a state of nonbeing. "Pralaya is described by Sinnett as a type of sleep, rest, or a time of inactivity." There are three different pralayas: 1) the mahapralaya, 2) the solar pralaya, 3) the minor pralaya.
Round is a full turnover via the seven globes. "During each round there is a maximum of 120 incarnations for each monad in each race with the average of 8,000 years between incarnations."

Man begins as a monad and dwells in seven major races on each of the seven planets. Each race takes circa one million years. Only 12,000 of those will be used for objective existence on the planets. The rest of that time will be used mainly in a subjective existence on the devachanic plane. "This meant that out of one million years – 988,000 years are spent reaping the effects of karma." (Note: In Mahatma Letters (letter 14) this number is "slightly different." The letter states that man "has passed in all his lives upon our planet (in this Round) but 77,700 years he has been in the subjective spheres 922,300 years.") A branch race is one of seven belonging to a subrace, itself one of seven belonging to a main race. "If each monad in each race incarnates once, the total number of incarnations in each globe would be 343 (7 branch races x 7 subraces x 7 root races); however, each monad incarnates typically at a minimum of two times and some even more frequently." In Mahatma Letters it is said that "one life in each of the seven root-races; seven lives in each of the 49 sub-races – or 7 x 7 x 7 = 343 and add 7 more. And then a series of lives in offshoot and branchlet races; making the total incarnations of man in each station or planet 777."

=== Theosophical Buddha ===
The ninth chapter of Sinnett's book called "Buddha". It begins with the words:

"The historical Buddha, as known to the custodians of the esoteric doctrine, is a personage whose birth is not invested with the quaint marvels popular story has crowded round it. Nor was his progress to adeptship traced by the literal occurrence of the supernatural struggles depicted in symbolic legend. On the other hand, the incarnation, which may outwardly be described as the birth of Buddha, is certainly not regarded by occult science as an event like any other birth, nor the spiritual development through which Buddha passed during his earth-life a mere process of intellectual evolution, like the mental history of any other philosopher. The mistake which ordinary European writers make in dealing with a problem of this sort lies in their inclination to treat exoteric legend either as a record of a miracle about which no more need be said, or as pure myth, putting merely a fantastic decoration on a remarkable life."

According to Lopez, author of Esoteric Buddhism "has a broader view of the Buddha" than that of Western Buddhologists and scholars of Oriental studies. Sinnett stated that the Buddha is simply one of a row "of adepts who have appeared over the course of the centuries." Buddha's next incarnation happened approximately sixty years after his death. He appeared as Shankara, the well-known Vedantic philosopher. Sinnett noted that for the uninitiated it is known that date of Shankara's birth is one thousand years after Buddha's death, and that he was hostile to Buddhism. Sinnett wrote that the Buddha came as Shankara "to fill up some gaps and repair certain errors in his own previous teaching." The Buddha had departed "from the practice of earlier adepts by opening the path" to adeptship to men of all castes. "Although well-intentioned, this led" to a deterioration of occult knowledge when it was penetrated into ignominious hands. Sinnett wrote that to further appeared a need "to take no candidates except from the class which, on the whole, by reason of its hereditary advantages, is likely to be the best nursery of fit candidates."
Sinnett claimed that the Buddha's next incarnation was as the great Tibetan adept reformer of the 14th century Tsong-ka-pa.

=== Against blind faith ===
In the tenth chapter Sinnett expresses (as well as the Mahatmas) his very negative attitude to religiosity of any kind. He argues:

"Nothing can produce more disastrous effects on human progress, as regards the destiny of individuals, than the very prevalent notion that one religion followed out in a pious spirit, is as good as another, and that if such and such doctrines are perhaps absurd when you look into them, the great majority of good people will never think of their absurdity, but will recite them in a blamelessly devoted attitude of mind." (Note: "It is priestly imposture that rendered these gods so terrible to man; it is religion that makes of him the selfish bigot, the fanatic that hates all mankind out of his own sect without rendering him any better or more moral for it. It is the belief in God and gods that makes two-thirds of humanity the slaves of a handful of those who deceive them under the false pretence of saving them. <...> In our [Tibetan] temples there is neither a god nor gods worshipped, only the thrice sacred memory of the greatest as the holiest man that ever lived.")

== Criticism ==
The presence of a secret or esoteric teaching in Buddhism is "not accepted by orthodox Buddhist." For example, Rhys Davids wrote:

"In this connection, I shall doubtless be expected to say a few words on Theosophy, if only because one of the books giving an account of that very curious and widely spread movement has been called Esoteric Buddhism. It has always been a point of wonder to me why the author should have chosen this particular title for his treatise. For if there is anything that can be said with absolute certainty about the book it is, that it is not esoteric, and not Buddhism. The original Buddhism was the very contrary of esoteric." (Note: Nonetheless Humphreys wrote that "Buddha's Teaching was not born from a spiritual vacuum, but was an expression of some portion of that Gupta Vidya 'the accumulated Wisdom of the ages', which antedates all known religions." "Gupta-vidya (Sanskrit) Gupta-vidyā [from gupta from the verbal root gup to conceal, preserve + vidyā knowledge, wisdom] Secret knowledge, secret wisdom; the source of all religions and philosophies known to the world: theosophy, the ancient wisdom-religion, the esoteric philosophy.") (Note: Sinnett received instructions from the Tibetan Masters, and Rhys Davids believed that Lamaism was a Religion not only different from Buddhism, but and being in his time in antagonism with the teachings and the institutions of original Buddhism. See also a book by Eva M. Dargyay)

Guénon's opinion on the subject was the same. He wrote that never was genuine "esoteric Buddhism." The ancient Buddhism was substantially an exoteric teaching "serving as theoretical support for a social movement with egalitarian tendencies." According to Guénon, Sinnett, who "at the beginning probably contributed more than anybody else to make Theosophism known in Europe, was genuinely fooled by all of Mme Blavatsky's tricks."

Some Theosophists did not share the views presented by Sinnett in his new work; for example, according to Kingsford, this book was very distant from the esoteric, and the main mistake of the author was that he thought about the symbols as reality.

== New editions and translations ==
After its first publication in 1883 the book was reprinted several times: in the same 1883 came 2nd edition, in 1885 – 5th, 1898 – 8th. This work has been translated into several European languages: French, German, Italian, Spanish, Russian. (Note: "153 editions published between 1883 and 2016 in 8 languages and held by 610 WorldCat member libraries worldwide".)

== See also ==
- Buddhism and Theosophy
- Incidents in the Life of Madame Blavatsky
- "Is Theosophy a Religion?"
- Mahatma Letters
- "The Esoteric Character of the Gospels"
- The Occult World
- The Secret Doctrine
- Theosophy and Western philosophy
