= Jane Sinnett =

English translator and author

- Born: Jane Fry; 8 March 1804; Westminster, London
- Died: 14 November 1870 (aged 66); London
- Burial place: Highgate Cemetery
- Occupations: Translator, author, critic
- Employer: The Westminster Review
- Children: Frederick Sinnett, Alfred Percy Sinnett (sons)

Jane Sinnett (née Fry; 8 March 1804 – 14 November 1870) was a British translator, author, and critic. Although less familiar than other 19th-century women writers, she was one among a growing group of female "travellers, translators and journalists during a period when women became increasingly robust participants in the publishing industry."

== Life ==
Jane Fry was born on 8 March 1804 in Westminster, London, the second daughter of nonconformists John and Sarah Fry.

Fry married Dublin-born journalist Edward William Percy Sinnett on 3 September 1825 in Holborn, London. The couple lived in Hamburg, Germany, where between 1826 and 1835, Sinnett gave birth to four children. Both had a strong knowledge of modern languages, and Jane Sinnett contributed to both the Dublin Review and The Athenaeum. Once back in England, Sinnett had another son, and her husband worked on the Morning Herald. The Sinnetts' daughter Sophia (b. 1828) became a painter and art teacher. One of their sons, Frederick (b. 1830), was a journalist and literary critic, and another, Alfred Percy Sinnett, was a journalist and theosophist.

Edward Sinnett died from consumption in May 1844, and Jane Sinnett's literary contributions were then to support herself and her children. She wrote translations and reviews for the publications including the Foreign and Quarterly Review, Bentley’s Miscellany, and regularly for The Westminster Review. Her reputation suffered from George Eliot's description of her as "tiresome" as a contributor to this latter journal, though it has since been argued that it related to Sinnett's failure to respond to proof correction, rather than to her skill as a German scholar. At one stage, Eliot hoped to take over Sinnett's regular 'belles lettres' section of The Westminster Review.

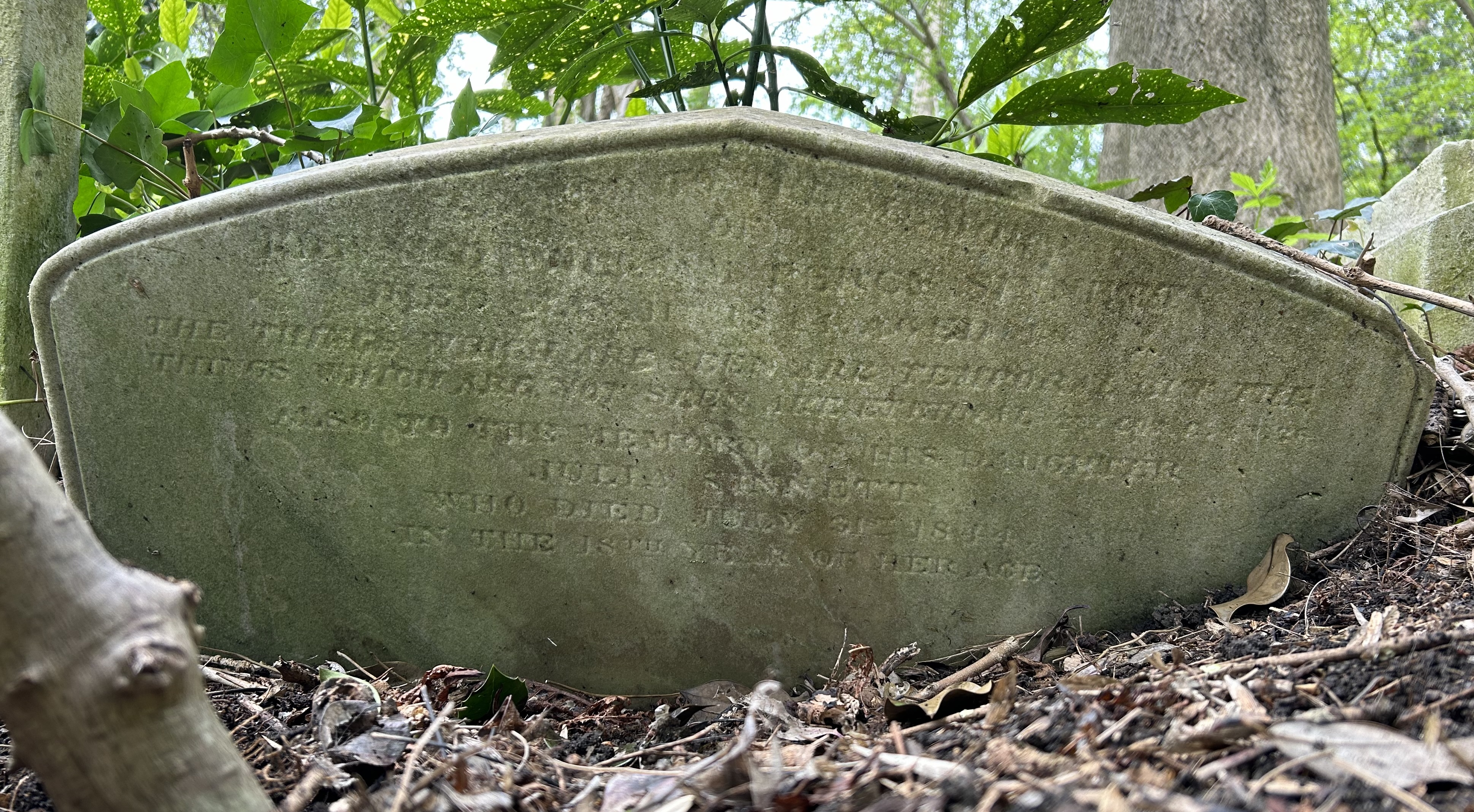
Grave of Jane Sinnett in Highgate Cemetery

Sinnett became known particularly for her translations of travel literature, including Ida Pfeiffer’s A Lady’s Voyage around the World (the only work by a woman traveller Sinnett ever translated), and works by Évariste Huc and Johann Kohl.

Sinnett died in London on 14 November 1870 and was buried on the western side of Highgate Cemetery.
