= Alexander Senkevich =

Russian Indologist (born 1941)

- Александр Сенкевич
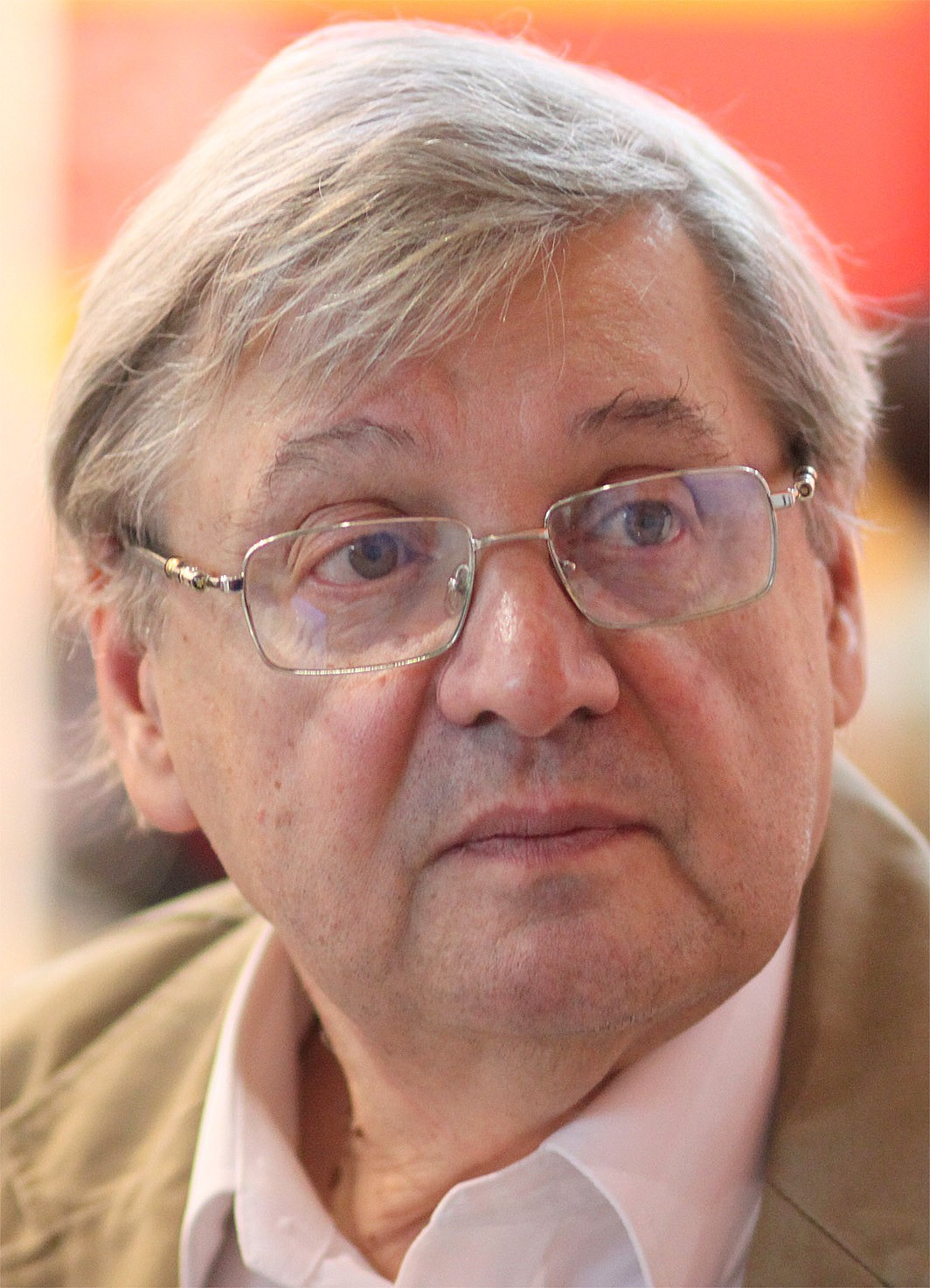
- Born: Alexander Nikolayevich Senkevich; 26 February 1941 (age 85); Moscow, Russian SFSR, Soviet Union
- Education: Institute of Oriental Languages (Doctor of Sciences)
- Occupations: Indologist, philologist, poet

Alexander Nikolayevich Senkevich (Russian: Алекса́ндр Никола́евич Сенке́вич, born 1941) is a Russian Indologist, philologist, translator from Hindi, writer, and poet. He is also known as Helena Blavatsky's biographer.

== Biography ==
Born in Moscow, USSR, Senkevich studied Indian literature at Institute of Oriental Languages. From 1970 he works for Gorky Institute of World Literature. He translated many works of eminent Hindi poets of 20th-century: Ashok Vajpeyi, Gajanan Madhav Muktibodh, Ganga Prasad Vimal, Harivanshrai Bachchan, Raghuvir Sahay, Sachchidananda Vatsyayan, Sarveshwar Dayal Saxena. In 1990 he obtained his Doktor nauk diploma. Senkevich is author of over 100 articles, many books and brochures.

Senkevich is a member of Union of Russian Writers. His first verses have been published in 1967 in Komsomolskaya Pravda. He took part in large scientific Indological conferences (1983, 1986, 1989). He is an initiator and the head of many Transhimalaya expeditions. In 1999 he became the head of "Russia-India Society."

== Publications ==
- Сенкевич, Александр Николаевич (1979). Хариванш Рай Баччан [Harivanshrai Bachchan] (in Russian). Москва: Наука.
- Сенкевич, Александр Николаевич (1987). Древняя и молодая. Проблемы и образы современной индийской литературы [Ancient and young. Problems and images of the modern Indian literature] (in Russian). Москва: Знание.
- Сенкевич, Александр Николаевич (2000). Семь тайн Елены Блаватской [Seven secrets of Helena Blavatsky] (in Russian). Москва: Современник. ISBN 5270012871.
- Сенкевич, Александр Николаевич (2010). Блаватская [Blavatsky]. Жизнь замечательных людей (in Russian). Москва: Молодая гвардия. ISBN 978-5-235-03283-5.
- Сенкевич, Александр Николаевич (2012). Елена Блаватская. Между светом и тьмой [Helena Blavatsky. Between Light and Darkness]. Носители тайных знаний (in Russian). Москва: Алгоритм. ISBN 978-5-4438-0237-4. OCLC 852503157.

=== Translations ===
- На ступеньках в солнцепёк. (1978) (in co-authorship)
- Из современной индийской поэзии. (1980) (in co-authorship)
- Сахай Рагхувир. Избранное. (1983)
- Индийская поэзия ХХ века, том 1. (1990)
- Индийская поэзия ХХ века, том 2. (1990)

=== Poetry ===
- Случайная игра. (1994)
- Чувство бытия. (2002)
- Мерцающая тьма. (2004)
- Предвестие. (2007)
- Западание клавиш. (2010)
- Скользящие тени. (2011)
