= Boris de Zirkoff =

American Theosophist (1902–1981)

- Борис Михайлович Цирков
- Born: 7 March 1902; Saint Petersburg, Russian Empire
- Died: 4 March 1981 (aged 78)
- Citizenship: USA (Note: He became a naturalized citizen of the United States on December 18, 1936.)
- Occupations: Theosophist; Editor; Writer
- Known for: H.P. Blavatsky's Collected Writings
- Parents: Mihail Vassilyevich de Zirkoff; Lydia Dmitriyevna von Hahn
- Awards: Subba Row Medal

Boris Mihailovich de Zirkoff (Russian: Бори́с Миха́йлович Цирко́в; 7 March [O.S. 22 February] 1902 – 4 March 1981) was an American Theosophist, editor and writer.

== Biography ==
External image
- Boris de Zirkoff

Boris de Zirkoff was born in Saint Petersburg, Russia on March 7, 1902. (Note: In the old Russian calendar it was February 22.) His father was Mihail Vassilyevich de Zirkoff, a Russian general. His mother was Lydia Dmitriyevna von Hahn, who was a second cousin to Helena Petrovna Blavatsky. (Note: Blavatsky's father and Zirkoff's grandfather (his mother's father) were first cousins.)

The Russian Revolution forced his family to flee in 1917 to Stockholm across Finland. Boris studied in some European universities, where he specialized in languages and classics. (Note: He had a gift for languages, eventually mastering English, French, German, and Swedish, as well as the classics.) "At Baden-Baden in Germany, he met a Russian American, Nikolai Romanoff, and learned from him about the existence, at Point Loma, close San Diego in California, of the organization, named Universal Brotherhood and Theosophical Society. He wrote a letter to Mrs. Katherine Tingley, then head of the Society, and when she visited Europe, they met in Finland. Mrs. Tingley, who had learned that Boris was Blavatsky's relative, invited him to come to the headquarters at Point Loma and promised him all the necessary help in regard to his travel to America." He performed this journey towards the end of 1923.

=== Blavatsky's Collected Writings ===
In 1924, while residing at the Headquarters of the Point Loma Theosophical Society, Boris resolved to compile Blavatsky's writings. This plan led to a worldwide correspondence and over 50 years of research. The first four volumes were published between 1933 and 1936 by "Rider & Co." as The Complete Works of H. P. Blavatsky, however, this edition forms were destroyed during World War II. These volumes were recovered only in 1966–69. Between 1950 and 1981, Boris managed to publish the first 12 volumes of Blavatsky's Collected Writings. "From his manuscripts for Volumes XIII and XIV the remaining numbered series were completed in 1982 and 1985. And a Cumulative Index Volume XV was then published in 1991."

From 1944 to 1981, De Zirkoff edited in Los Angeles a magazine Theosophia. According to WorldCat, Boris had written 49 works. (Note: "Works: 49 works in 87 publications in 2 languages and 476 library holdings.") In 1980, he was awarded the Subba Row Medal.

== Published works ==
- H. P. Blavatsky's Collected Writings (alternative). 15 vols. Wheaton, Ill: Quest Books/Theosophical Publishing House, 1933–1991 (with Dara Eklund as assistant ed.)
- Blavatsky chronological index. 1967. OCLC 224303091.
- Blavatsky letters index. Wheaton, Chicago: Olcott Library and Research Center. 1989. OCLC 224594381.
- Hypnotism, Mesmerism and Reincarnation: Some Startling Facts in the Light of the Esoteric Philosophy. Literary Licensing, LLC. 2013 [1956]. ISBN 9781494012663. OCLC 933172798.
- Rebirth of the Occult Tradition: How The Secret Doctrine of H.P. Blavatsky was Written. Wheaton, Ill.: Theosophical Publishing House. 1977. ISBN 9780835675352. OCLC 4837832.
- The dream that never dies: Boris de Zirkoff speaks out on theosophy. San Diego, Calif.: Point Loma Publications. 1983. ISBN 9780913004456. OCLC 17026835.

Translations

- From the Caves and Jungles of Hindostan, 1883–1886. Blavatsky: Collected writings. Translated by de Zirkoff, B. Wheaton, Ill.: Theosophical Publishing House. 1975. ISBN 9780835602198. OCLC 988188695.
