= Ganga Prasad Vimal =

Indian writer (1939–2019)

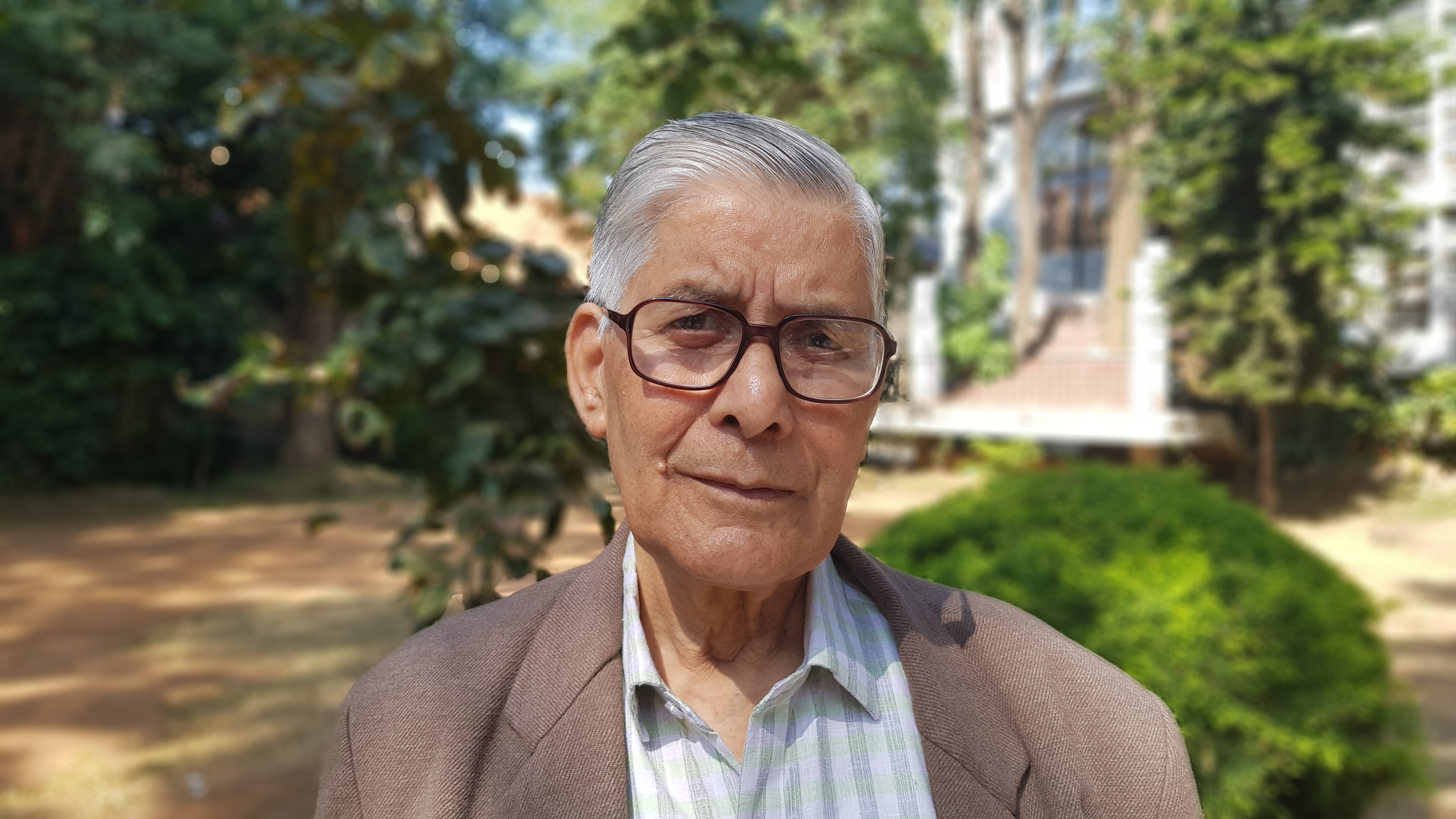
Ganga Prasad Vimal in 2019

Ganga Prasad Vimal (also Gangaprasad Vimal) (3 June 1939 – 23 December 2019) was an Indian writer. He was a poet, story writer, novelist and translator.

== Early life and education ==
Ganga Prasad Vimal was born in 1939 in Uttarkashi, a Himalayan town in Uttarakhand state. In most of his writings, he has shown his concern towards saving the Himalayas and nearby regions and preserving trees. He was educated in Garhwal, Rishikesh, Allahabad, Yamunanagar and Punjab. In 1963 he started learning as a student in Summer School of Linguistics, Osmania University, Hyderabad. He secured top grades, creating a record in his Master's examination and was awarded University Fellowship of Punjab University. Talented and creative since his childhood, he had expertise in many literary and administrative fields. In 1965 he was awarded Doctor of Philosophy working on an inter-disciplinary subject. In the same year, he married Kamlesh Anamika on 5 February 1965. He has a son Ashish (born in 1969) and a daughter Kanupriya (1975).

After short stint as a freelance writer, he edited the weekly 'Deshsewa' besides actively engaging himself in student politics.

== Career ==
Dr. Vimal worked as Research Fellow for three years from 1961 to 1964 at Punjab University. He taught Hindi language and literature from 1962 to 1964 in the same university. He worked as Research Supervisor for many research students at Jakir Hussain College, Delhi University from 1964 to 1989. He was appointed Director of Central Hindi Directorate (Department of Education) in 1989 and he worked there up to 1997, and National Council for the Promotion of the Sindhi language 1989–1993 as Sindhi language promotional board at New Delhi and as Director, headquarters at Badodara 1993–1995.

Besides this he worked for many projects related to dictionaries and material related to knowledge of languages. He also worked in many government organizations and committees which decide, act and policies related to Indian languages.

He worked as Professor at Center of Indian Language, School of Language, literature and cultural studies, Jawaharlal Nehru University, New Delhi from 1999 to 2004. From 1999 to 2000 he was the head of the department. During this period he was Mphil and PhD guide of many students and associated with national and international institutions furthering research in languages.

Dr. Vimal was interested in creative writing since the beginning because of which he wrote many books. He wrote more than one dozen poetry collections and short story collections, novels and he translated five books in English. He translated around fifteen books from other languages including poems, stories and novels. He gave speeches in many countries related to his research work. He received many awards and honors in many countries for literature and culture mainly Poetry People Prize (1978); Diploma from Art University, Rome (1979); Gold Medal, National Museum of Literature, Sofia (1979); Dinkar Award from government of Bihar (1987); International Open Scottish Poetry Prize (1988), Indian Language Award (Bhartiya Bhasha Parishad) (1992) and Mahatma Gandhi samman, U.P. (2016). He read many research papers which included reading of his stories on BBC London and poetry reading on All India Radio. He was nominated for Sahitya Academy Award in 2019 for 'Main Bhi Jaoonga', a story collection published in 2016.

Dr. Vimal also worked as Chief Literary Advisor for Argalaa, a quarterly magazine of jansamvedna and Hindi literature of the 21st century.

== Criticism ==
Vimal's work was discussed as not quite meeting the mark set by Kamala Markandaya.

== Death ==
Ganga Prasad Vimal died on 23 December 2019, in a car crash in Sri Lanka along with his daughter and grandson. He died in motor accident at Southern Highway in Sri Lanka.

== Publications ==
- Poetry Collections: Vijjap (1967), Bodhi Vriksh (1983), Itna Kuchh (1990), Talisman, Poems & Stories, Duel Text (1990), Sannate Se Muthbhed (1994), Main Wahan Hoon (1996), Alikhit-Adikhat (2004), Kuchh To Hai (2006), Khabren aur Anya Kavitayen (2010), Pachaas Kavitayen (2015), Talisman (poem and stories, Dual Text, London (1990).
- Story Collections: Koi Shuruaat, (1972), Ateet Mein Kucch,(1973), Idhar Udhar,(1980), Baahar Na Bheetar (1981), Charchit Kahaaniyan (1983), Meri kahaniyaan (1983), Khoyi Hui Thaati (1994), Charchit Kahaaniyan (1994), Samagra Kahaaniyan (2004), Ikkis kahaniyaan (2010), Main Bhi Aaunga (2015).
- Novels: Apne Se Alag (1969), Kahin Kucch Aur (1971), Mareechika (1978), Mrigaantak (1978), Manushkhor (2013).
- Essays: Many essays published in famous magazines.
- Edited Books: Abhivyakti, Edited an anthology of Modern Hindi Poetry (1964), Ageya Ka Rachna Sansar, (The World of Ageya) (1966), Muktibodh Ka Rachna Sansar (The creative world of Gajanan Madhav Muktibodh - An Anthology of essays on Muktibodh (1966), Laava Edited an anthology of Modern English Poetry (1974), Adhunik Hindi Kahani An Anthology of Essays of Modern short fiction by Eminent Professors, critics and creative writers (1978), Kraantikari Sanuuhgaan A small Anthology of Revolutionary songs with S. Swami, (1979), Naagri Lipi Ki Vajnanikta (Naagri Lipi Parishad, New Delhi), Vaakya Vichar (2002).
- Books in English Translations: Here and There and Other Stories, Collection of short stories in English (1978), Mirage, Talisman (1987), No Sooner, poetry collection in English translation (1987), Who Lives Where and Other Poems (2004), Unwritten and Unseen (2010), Tiger Tantra (2010).
- Prose Books in Hindi: Samkalen Kahani Ka Rachna Vidhan (critical evaluation of contemporary short Fiction) (1968), Prem Chand (Revolution of Writer Prem Chand) (1968), Adhunk sahity ke sandarbh mein (1978), Adhunikata Uttar Adhunikata (2011), Ajit kumar sanchayan (2011), Chandrakunwar Baratwal Sanchayan (2012), Hindi ki Arambhik Kahaniyaan (2012), Sankalit kahaniyaan (2013),
- Hindi Translations: Gadya Samkaaleen Kahaani Ka Rachna Vidhan (1968), Prem Chand (1968), Aadhunik Sahitya Ke Sandarbh Mein (1978).
- Hindi Translations from other languages: Duurant Yatrayen (Elizabetha Bagrayana; 1978), Pitra Bhuumishch (Hristo Botev; 1978), Dav Ke Tale (Ivan Vazov; 1978), Prasantak (Visilisi Vistasit; 1979), Hara Tota (Miko Takeyama; 1979), Janm Bhumi and Other Poems (Nikola Vaptsarov; 1979), Poems of Ľubomír (1982), Poems of Lachezar Elenkov (1983), Udgam (Kamen Kalchev's Novel; 1981), Poems of Bozhilov Bozhidar (1984), Story of Yordan Yovkov (1984), Poems of Yodan Milev (1995), Tamamraat Aag (1996), Marg (Poems of German Dugan Broods; 2004).
