= K. Paul Johnson =

American historian (born 1953)

Kenneth Paul Johnson (born 1953) is a retired public library director from southern Virginia, and a writer on modern Western esotericism as well as North Carolina history.

== Books ==
- Report of Proceedings: Secret Doctrine Centenary (Theosophical University Press, 1989) includes a presentation by Johnson, "The Chaldean Book of Numbers".
- In Search of the Masters (self-published, 1990)
- The Masters Revealed (SUNY Press, 1994)
- Initiates of Theosophical Masters (SUNY Press, 1995)
- Edgar Cayce in Context (SUNY Press, 1998).
- The Inner West (Tarcher/Penguin, 2004)
- Dictionary of Modern American Philosophers (Thoemmes, 2005)
- Dictionary of Virginia Biography, Vol. 3 (Library of Virginia, 2006)
- Pell Mellers: Race and Memory in a Carolina Pocosin (Backintyme, 2008, 2013)
- Carolina Genesis: Beyond the Color Line (Backintyme, 2010)

== Articles ==
- Johnson, K. Paul. "book review, Brother Twelve by John Oliphant". Gnosis. 26 (Winter 1993): 71.
- Johnson, K. Paul. "Imaginary Mahatmas". Gnosis. 28 (Summer 1993): 24.
- Johnson, K. Paul. "book review, HPB: The Extraordinary Life of Helena Blavatsky by Sylvia Cranston". Gnosis. 29 (Fall 1993): 66.
- Johnson, K. Paul. "Holy Book of Baha'is Unveiled in English". Gnosis. 30 (Winter 1994): 8.
- Johnson, K. Paul. "book review, The White Buddhist by Stephen Prothero". Gnosis. 41 (Fall 1996): 42.
- Johnson, K. Paul. "Baha'i Leaders Vexed by On-line Critics". Gnosis. 42 (Winter 1997): 10.
- Johnson, K. Paul. "After Life Visions of a Sleeping Prophet". Gnosis. 42 (Winter 1997): 34.
- Johnson, K. Paul. "Albert Leighton Rawson". Theosophical History. 1988 (July): 230.
- Johnson, K. Paul. "Theosophical Influence in Baha'i History". Theosophical History. 1992 (January): 24.
- Johnson, K. Paul. "International Theosophical History Conference". Theosophical History. 1992 (July): 73.
- Johnson, K. Paul. "book review, Arktos: The Polar Myth in Science, Symbolism & Nazi Survival by Joscelyn Godwin". Theosophical History. 1993 (October 1992-January 1993): 105.
- Johnson, K. Paul. "book review, Helena P. Blavatsky ou la reponse du Sphinx by Noel Richard-Nafarre". Theosophical History. 1993 (October 1992-January 1993): 159.
- Johnson, K. Paul. "Response to John Algeo's Review of The Masters Revealed". Theosophical History. 1995 (October): 264.
