= Hodgson Report =

1885 report by the Society for Psychical Research

Report of the committee appointed to investigate phenomena connected with the Theosophical Society, commonly called the Hodgson Report was an 1885 report by the Society for Psychical Research (SPR) on Helena Blavatsky and purportedly apported Mahatma Letters.

== History ==
Richard Hodgson, a member of the SPR and a research worker of paranormal phenomena, was sent to India. Hodgson's task was to examine if the mode of appearance attributed to the Mahatma Letters represented genuine psychical phenomena. In December 1884 Hodgson arrived in Adyar. He eventually concluded that the evidence supported Emma Coulomb, and that various inconsistencies, misrepresentations, and provable falsehoods in sworn statements by certain Theosophical Society members destroyed their credibility. He included in his research examination of the physical spaces where phenomena had been reported, including architectural features that had been concealed or removed from their original placements. Hodgson wrote a 200-page report, in which Blavatsky was described "as one of the most accomplished, ingenious, and interesting impostors in history."

The report considers at length if letters from Blavatsky provided by the Coulombs as evidence for fraudulent activity were genuinely from her hand, the consistency and credibility of various people who claimed to have witnessed psychic phenomena that occurred through Blavatsky, possible methods by which many purported phenomena might have been humanly produced, and references to various accounts of these phenomena as they had been published or circulated in public knowledge. The Hodgson report is detailed and contains extensive appendices.

Blavatsky's reputation was seriously damaged due to the Hodgson Report.

== See also ==
- Coulomb Affair
- Incidents in the Life of Madame Blavatsky
