= Zinovia Dushkova =

Russian author, poet, philosopher, and historian

- Born: 19 July 1953 (age 73); Congaz, Moldavian Soviet Socialist Republic
- Education: Far Eastern State University; Bauman Moscow State Technical University (PhD)
- Occupations: Author, poet, philosopher, historian
- Writing career
- Language: Russian
- Years active: 1992–present
- Genres: Spirituality, Theosophy, Metaphysics, New Thought
- Notable works: The Teaching of the Heart; The Book of Secret Wisdom
- Notable awards: Nautilus Book Awards
- Website: dushkova.com/en

Zinovia Vasilievna Dushkova (Gagauz: Zinovya Duşkova, Russian: Зино́вья Васи́льевна Ду́шкова; born 19 July 1953) is a Russian author, poet, philosopher, and historian. Dushkova has written approximately 60 books which have been published in both Russia and Ukraine and translated into seven languages. Dushkova's philosophy is influenced by Blavatsky's Theosophy.

== Life ==
Dushkova was born in the village of Congaz in the Moldavian Soviet Socialist Republic (currently the Republic of Moldova). Her father, Vasily Ivanovich Dushkov (1925–1957), was the chairman of the collective farm "Russia" in Moldova. Her mother, Antonina Ivanovna Dushkova (1927–1980), was a land surveyor who participated in geological expeditions. Dushkova's father held a senior position, and for this reason, during Soviet times, he was not permitted to baptize his children. But her grandmother secretly brought the newborn child into a church and had her baptized. Since during the rite of baptism there was no one present except a priest and the grandmother, she became Dushkova's godmother and the child was named after her. As Dushkova's parents were absorbed in their work, she spent her entire early childhood with her grandmother. After her father's death in 1957 from fulminant tuberculosis, her grandmother became fully responsible for Dushkova's upbringing. After her grandmother's death in 1964, Dushkova's mother Antonina along with her 11-year-old daughter, moved to the village of Staroye Sheptakhovo in the Chuvash Republic. In 1970, Dushkova returned to Moldova, but then moved to work in Odesa, Ukraine, in 1971; from there, in 1972, she moved to the Russian Far East, where she spent the following 27 years. Dushkova moved to Moscow in 1999.

Zinovia Dushkova has two sons: Andrey (born 1972), graduated Lomonosov Moscow State University, a linguist, and Sergey (born 1979), graduated Moscow State University of Civil Engineering, a social worker.

== Education ==
Dushkova studied at a secondary school in Cheboksary and at the school located in the village of Bolshoe Yanikovo. In 1986, Dushkova matriculated in the Far Eastern State University in Vladivostok with a specialization in history. Upon graduation, she worked as a teacher of history in a school.

Dushkova was promoted to PhD in Philosophy in 2009 with a thesis called, Rol' lichnosti v istorii: istoriosofskiy analiz ("The Role of Personality in History: A Historiosophical Analysis"), at the philosophy department of the Bauman Moscow State Technical University.

== Writing career ==
Zinovia Dushkova lived in monasteries located in the mountains, deserts, and caves of Tibet, Mongolia, Nepal, and India. As a result of her long travels and studies, she wrote nearly 60 books. They have been published in Russia and Ukraine and have been translated into seven languages.

Some of them are works of fiction, while she regards others as having been handed down by the "Masters of the Ancient Wisdom", or "Mahatmas", and as being based on the "knowledge of the heart" and "enlightenment". Dushkova claims that these books were written not through mediumship or channeling, but were the result of what she calls the "Fiery Experience", and she explains it as divine inspiration. She says that writing books in this way requires many years of training, which adversely affects one's physical health and demands one's isolation from society.

=== Influences and the first books ===
Dushkova had studied the history of Christianity and the lives of Orthodox saints since early childhood. Later, while living in Vladivostok, she started to be interested in other world religions such as Buddhism, Hinduism, and Islam, and she studied the work of Helena Blavatsky and Helena Roerich. As a historian, she also studied the sacred texts in terms of their moral and ethical teachings.

This whole experience inspired her to write her first work of fiction, Probuzhdenie Istoka ("Awakening of the Source"), in 1992. There followed poetry collections and more fiction: Melodii Dushi ("Melodies of the Soul"), Latyn' nevospetaya ("Unsung Latin"), Grani Sveta ("Facets of Light"), Preodolenie ("Overcoming"), and Epopeya ("Epopee").

In 1995 Dushkova took her first trip to India, during which she wrote the book Bratstvo: Nadzemnaya Obitel' ("Brotherhood: The Ethereal Abode"). Work on it began in the study at Helena Roerich's estate in Naggar. According to the author, it is a continuation of the teaching of Agni Yoga and its logical conclusion. It is said that, during that trip, Dushkova also met with Master Morya in the Buddhist Ghoom Monastery, where his meetings with Helena Blavatsky and Helena Roerich had presumably taken place before. Additionally she states that she gained access to the Book of Dzyan, from which she translated a new fragment from the Senzar language and published it in The Book of Secret Wisdom.

=== The Teaching of the Heart and other works ===
The most significant work by Dushkova is The Teaching of the Heart, consisting of a series of books which were written while she traveled across India, Russia, Egypt, Israel, and Japan. The series was begun at Helena Roerich's estate in Kalimpong in October 1997 and its books were later written in places such as the Trinity Lavra of St. Sergius, Jerusalem, Bethlehem, Nazareth, Magdala, Mount Carmel, the Kremlin in Moscow, and Vladivostok.

Other books by Dushkova include Ognennaya Bibliya ("The Fiery Bible"), Evangelie ot Sofii – Sily i Premudrosti Bozhiey ("The Gospel of Sophia – the Power and Wisdom of God"), and Taynaya Doktrina Lyubvi ("The Secret Doctrine of Love"). She also wrote books intended for children and youth: Skazki dlya Messii ("Fairy Tales for the Messiah"), Skazki kotorye rastut vmeste s nami ("Fairy Tales which Grow Together with Us"), 77 Zhemchuzhin siyayushchikh na chetkakh Vremeni ("77 Pearls Shining on the Beads of Time"), and Kniga Pritchey ("The Book of Parables").

Since 2004, Dushkova has ceased to meet with her readers in Russia and Ukraine, having bidden them farewell at the last meeting held in Moscow on 24 March, and has focused on trips abroad.

From 2004 to 2016, Dushkova worked on the Dialogi ("Dialogues") trilogy in which she discusses the inner organization of Shambhala. The first two volumes were published in Russian in 2012, and the third in 2017.

== Teachings and ideas ==
According to the 12-year research by Lyudmila Grigoryeva, the Head of the Department of Religious Studies of Astafyev Krasnoyarsk State Pedagogical University, and Tatyana Simanzhenkova, the teaching of Zinovia Dushkova, being the continuation of the Theosophical tradition and occult-mystical in its nature, develops this religious orientation and devises new worldviews of the social and cosmic evolution of humanity in the transitional period. This teaching develops one of the fundamental ideas of the Roerichs' doctrine, outlined in the book Heart of the Agni Yoga series, considering it the most important in the modern social and cultural situation.

The study showed that, among a wide variety of teachings in modern Russia and Ukraine, The Teaching of the Heart is distinguished by its ethical and humanistic orientation, an unusual way of thinking, and a vivid form of exposition.

=== Primary role of the heart ===
Dushkova identifies the primary role of the heart in the spiritual development of individuals. All of her books have in common the idea of cultivating the qualities of the heart, such as love, compassion, mercy, forgiveness, and gratitude, which, according to the author, contribute to the spiritual and moral formation of the individual. Her first published book Bratstvo: Nadzemnaya Obitel' formulates this basic idea of the teaching by saying: "Go by the way of the Heart." She believes that "one religion" for modern humanity must be love, and therefore Dushkova's main appeal throughout her books is to "open the heart".

=== Unity of all religions ===
The central postulate of the teaching is the idea that there is one divine source of all religions. This idea is presented by Dushkova as a combination of two world religions in three images of the one deity: "The time of Maitreya, Buddha, and Christ has come; at their essence, they are One. Three times are merging, erasing the borders between them. The Past has intersected with the Future at point of the Present. The Great Buddha of the North appeared in the Image of Maitreya, bearing the features of the Resurrected Christ." This syncretic idea is developed in all other Dushkova's writings, as well.

=== Hierarchy of the heart ===
Continuing the Theosophical tradition, Christ, according to the teaching, is one of the "cosmic hierarchs", who incarnate themselves on the Earth in order to help humanity. Dushkova develops Agni Yoga's fundamental idea of "cosmic hierarchy" by introducing the concept of the "hierarchy of the heart" that includes the "heart of infinity", the "heart of the planet", and the "heart of the human being". The latter is presented as a "small cell of the heart of infinity", serving as a connecting link between worlds and as the container of the "fire of love".

Just as in Agni Yoga, the Great White Brotherhood in The Teaching of the Heart directs the evolution of humanity, preserving society from regression and decay. Essentially the brotherhood in Dushkova's teaching is the organizing and uniting principle which gives an impulse of high evolutionary frequency that maintains the stability of the social system and establishes the conditions for further improvement.

=== Fiery baptism ===
As in the Eastern tradition, Dushkova's teaching speaks of the one energy of the Cosmos, Nature, and human beings and relies on the Theosophical version of Cosmogenesis, in which the Absolute is seen as the primary fiery energy that during evolution turns into spirit and matter. According to the teaching, there are certain historical periods during which this energy, or "spatial fire", is intensified in order to influence the evolution of humanity, bringing matter into a more subtle state; Dushkova calls such periods "fiery baptism".

The Teaching of the Heart says it is through the human heart that the evolutionary wave of these transformative fiery energies will pass at the end of the "great cycle", which coincides with present times. Therefore, according to Dushkova, the primary focus of attention should be shifted to the heart, because it is the "main transmuter" of these energies.

=== Optimistic future ===
The Teaching of the Heart explains that modern civilization has come to a dividing line in its development when all the quality parameters of life are to change. Since the human being is involved not only in processes occurring on the Earth, but also in the Cosmos as a whole, Dushkova calls upon people to coordinate their actions with global world processes and to recognize responsibility for every step in life, saying that humanity can proceed further only through love.

Being social and optimistic in nature, the teaching rejects the dramatic concepts of the end of the world and promotes a more peaceful path to salvation, which occurs through a gradual familiarization with the "divine reality". Although natural disasters cannot be avoided, they are described as "natural ways of purification", providing the opportunity to establish "a new heaven and a new earth" to be inhabited by a transfigured humanity.

=== Messianism ===
According to The Teaching of the Heart, the periods of the greatest manifestation of the "spatial fire" are also connected with the beginning of a new "Messianic" cycle when Maitreya, the Lord of Shambhala, should arrive in order to unite humanity and to build together a new society after the purification of the Earth.

=== Mother of the World's era ===
Following the Theosophical tradition, the teaching shows that the coming era will be the era of the "Mother of the World". Dushkova presents woman and man as the two cosmic principles that are destined to acquire their equal rights and stand side by side as colleagues.

== Reception ==
After its publication in 1998, The Teaching of the Heart rapidly gained readers in Russia and Ukraine, as well as in Kazakhstan and Moldova, marking the beginning of a movement which organized festivals of spiritual culture, exhibitions, musical evenings, and round tables for different types of activity: pedagogical, educational, and artistic. The first large-scale forum took place in Kyiv in 1999 and was held every year afterward in cities such as Cheboksary, Krasnoyarsk, Kemerovo, and Vladivostok. In August 2001, in Kemerovo, participants of this movement created Zvezda Vostoka ("Star of the East"), an interregional public organization for supporting science, culture, and art. It aimed "to unite all who advocate moral values, who contribute to the evolutionary development of society through cooperation in the domains of science, economics, education, and culture." Later, branches of Zvezda Vostoka were opened in many cities of Russia, Ukraine, and Kazakhstan. Religious scholars regarded this organization as one of the three largest centers of Roerichism in Russia and Ukraine.

The followers of The Teaching of the Heart believe that it, Helena Roerich's Agni Yoga, and Helena Blavatsky's The Secret Doctrine represent the three parts of the "one revelation" handed down to humankind by the "Masters of Wisdom".

In 2005, Astafyev Krasnoyarsk State Pedagogical University published a book intended for teachers, parents, high school students, and professionals in the field of pedagogy and psychology, which recommended 77 Zhemchuzhin siyayushchikh na chetkakh Vremeni for use in education and used excerpts from The Teaching of the Heart and other Dushkova's books from the standpoint of a person's moral upbringing.

In the same year, Auezov Semipalatinsk University in Kazakhstan published methodological recommendations on using the book and audiobook Skazki dlya Messii in secondary schools, orphanages, and other children's educational establishments. According to these recommendations, "The book is a significant phenomenon in the contemporary literary process, and in terms of the purity of its moral lessons it is comparable to The Little Prince by Antoine de Saint-Exupéry." They also noted the highly psycho-corrective and psychotherapeutic effect of these fairy tales in comparison with others, because they are based on replacing a destructive style of behavior with a constructive one.

In various cities of Russia and Ukraine, teachers and parents who used Skazki dlya Messii for reading in orphanages, boarding schools, detention centers, and classrooms noted the positive impact of the tales on the psycho-emotional state of children, especially those who were considered "difficult". Pankaj Malviya used Skazki dlya Messii in the process of teaching students at the Department of Russian Language of Punjab University in Chandigarh, India. The Japanese researcher of Russian fairy tales, Professor Yoshikazu Nakamura, included Skazki dlya Messii in a course for students of Russian language and literature at Hitotsubashi University in Tokyo.

After a competitive selection process in 2006 by the children's and educational publisher Nathan in Paris, Le Beau Soleil et autres contes ("The Red Sun and Other Fairy Tales"), the French edition of Skazki dlya Messii, was reviewed by the professional magazine for teachers Journal des Instituteurs et Professeurs des écoles (JDI) with recommendations as to how to use the book in the educational process. By the decision of the competitive board, packages with 30 copies of the book each were sent to many schools of France. During the 2006–2007 academic year the teachers at these schools studied the psychological and pedagogical impact of the fairy tales on their students.

In 2020, the British magazine Watkins Mind Body Spirit ranked Zinovia Dushkova as number 49 in its annual list of the "100 Most Spiritually Influential Living People".

== Criticism ==
The Russian Orthodox Church categorically rejects the teachings of Blavatsky and the Roerichs. In 1994, the Council of Bishops declared that they were "incompatible with Christianity" and people who shared and promoted these teachings had "excommunicated themselves from the Orthodox Church". Patriarchate representatives at a 2004 Novosibirsk conference once again testified to the "antichristian and destructive nature" of various New Age teachings, including those of Helena Blavatsky, Helena Roerich, and Zinovia Dushkova.

However, among the followers of the Roerichs' teachings, the publication of Bratstvo: Nadzemnaya Obitel' in 1997 also caused controversy as to whether it came from the same source as Agni Yoga. Thus, Lyudmila Shaposhnikova, the director of the International Center of the Roerichs (ICR) in Moscow, made disparaging remarks on the book and its author, stating that Bratstvo was given by the "dark forces" because no new teachings would be given "in the next 200 years, as well as in the future". Then the Council of the Siberian Roerich Society, which itself was the former branch of ICR, denounced Dushkova as a "false teacher". In response to these accusations, Dushkova's supporters quoted Helena Roerich's letters in which Roerich herself predicted the appearance of "Agni Yoga in new conditions" at the very end of the 20th century.

== Exhibitions ==
In 2003, an exhibition entitled "Geography of Travels" was organized, at which 60 photographs as well as the author's videos were presented. They had been made during Dushkova's travels to places that are regarded as holy in countries such as Egypt, Israel, India, Italy, China, Mongolia, Tibet, France, and Japan. The exhibition was first displayed in Moscow, and then in other cities in Russia, Ukraine, and France.

In 2009, Moscow hosted an international exhibition of children's drawings called "Create Your Fairy Tale", organized by Dushkova Publishing and the A.P. Bogolyubov Library of the Arts. The exhibition featured drawings based on Skazki dlya Messii by children from different cities in Russia and France.

== Awards and honours ==
In 2015, Dushkova was awarded the "20 Years of Gagauzia" Medal which was established by Gagauzian People's Assembly. In 2017, The Call of the Heart, the first book of The Teaching of the Heart series, was awarded a silver medal by the Nautilus Book Awards in the United States.

== Bibliography in English ==
Zinovia Dushkova has written approximately 60 books in Russian. The following have been published in English:

- The Book of Secret Wisdom (Radiant Books, 2015), ISBN 978-5-9905431-4-0
- Parables from Shambhala (Radiant Books, 2016), ISBN 978-5-9905431-6-4
- The Teaching of the Heart Series:
  - The Call of the Heart (Radiant Books, 2016), ISBN 978-5-9908268-1-6
  - The Illumination of the Heart (Radiant Books, 2016), ISBN 978-5-9908268-3-0
  - The Heart of the Community (Radiant Books, 2017), ISBN 978-5-9908268-5-4
  - The Heart of Infinity (Radiant Books, 2017), ISBN 978-5-9908268-7-8
  - The Fiery Hierarchy (Radiant Books, 2017), ISBN 978-5-9908268-9-2
  - The Fiery Heart (Radiant Books, 2018), ISBN 978-5-6040586-1-9
  - The World of Fire (Radiant Books, 2018), ISBN 978-5-6040586-3-3
  - The Prayer of the Heart (Radiant Books, 2018), ISBN 978-5-6040586-5-7
  - Brotherhood (Radiant Books, 2019), ISBN 978-5-6043042-1-1
  - The Sun of Love (Radiant Books, 2019), ISBN 978-5-6043042-3-5
  - The Joy of the Heart (Radiant Books, 2020), ISBN 978-5-6043042-5-9
  - The Rainbow of Fire (Radiant Books, 2020), ISBN 978-5-6043042-7-3
  - The Fruit of Love (Radiant Books, 2020), ISBN 978-5-6043042-9-7
- The Secret Book of Dzyan (Radiant Books, 2018), ISBN 978-5-6040586-7-1
- The Ascending Goddess (Radiant Books, 2020), ISBN 978-5-6044890-1-7
