= The Voice of the Silence =

1889 book by Helena Blavatsky

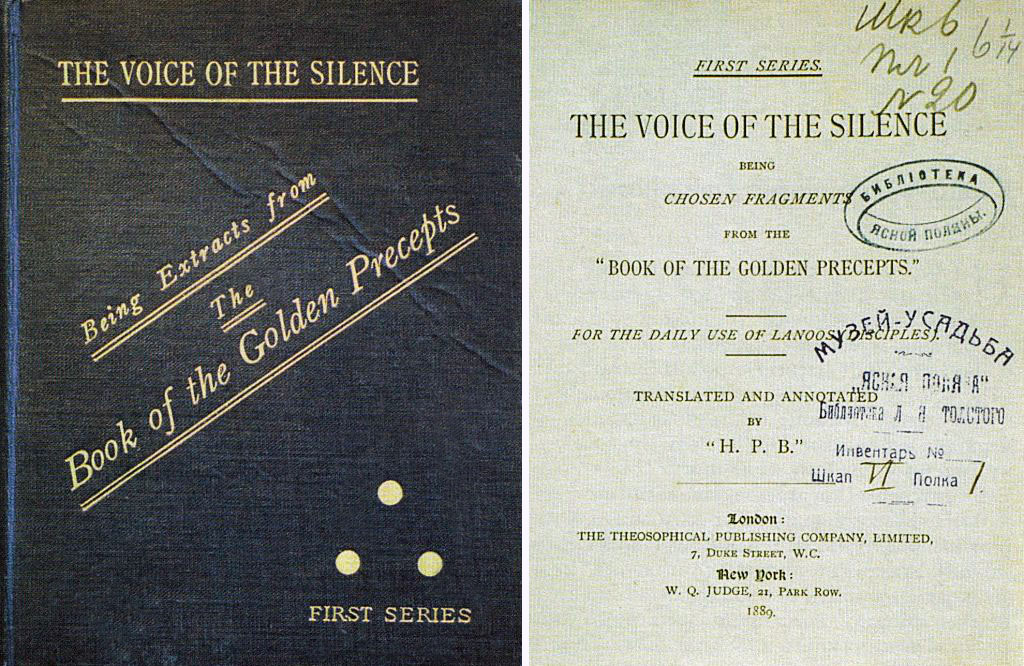
- The Voice of the Silence presented by Blavatsky to Leo Tolstoy
- Author: Helena Petrovna Blavatsky
- Publication date: 1889

The Voice of the Silence is a book by Helena Petrovna Blavatsky. It was written in Fontainebleau and first published in 1889. According to Blavatsky, it is a translation of fragments from a sacred book she encountered during her studies in the East, called "The Book of the Golden Precepts".

== Contents ==
The book is formed of three parts:

1. The Voice of the Silence
2. The Two Paths
3. The Seven Portals

== Reception ==
A reviewer for D. T. Suzuki's Eastern Buddhist Society commented: "Undoubtedly Madame Blavatsky had in some way been initiated into the deeper side of Mahayana teaching and then gave out what she deemed wise to the Western world..." In the journal of the Buddhist Society, Suzuki commented: "here is the real Mahayana Buddhism".

The 14th Dalai Lama wrote the preface for the centennial edition by Concord Grove Press.

== See also ==
- Blavatsky's poetry
- Book of Dzyan
