= Senzar =

Senzar may refer to:

- Senzar language
- a historical name of Shaizar in Syria
