= Reigle =

Reigle is a surname. Notable people with the surname include:

- Daniel P. Reigle (1841–1917), Union Army soldier and Medal of Honor recipient
- David Reigle (born 1952), American writer and scholar
- Ed Reigle (1924–2003), Canadian ice hockey player

== See also ==
- Reigle Field, airport in Lebanon County, Pennsylvania, United States
