= Senzar language =

Supposed original language of the stanzas of Dzyan

Senzar is a supposed original language of the stanzas of Dzyan. It is referenced in multiple locations in works of Helena Blavatsky.

== History ==
In her Secret Doctrine Blavatsky calls Senzar "a tongue absent from the nomenclature of languages and dialects with which philology is acquainted" (SD, I, xxxvii). The Theosophical Glossary (p. 295) defines it as "the mystic name for the secret sacerdotal language or the 'Mystery-speech' of the initiated Adepts, all over the world."

In Isis Unveiled Blavatsky identifies Senzar as being "ancient Sanskrit" (Isis, I, 440). As noted by John Algeo in his book, Blavatsky's other statements about Senzar (including the above linkage to Sanskrit) create a number of puzzles, which make it difficult to take the etymological language family references literally, since some link to Egyptian sources, while yet others are still of other roots. Obviously, as she says multiple times in her works, nothing truly esoteric is ever given out to the public, let alone is it published in any widely circulated volume. The origin of the language Senzar must be taken as secret, and the puzzles encountered by Algeo are merely blinds. As Blavatsky writes from the perspective of an occultist with a perennialist bent, she insists on a common root to all things, language and the secret sciences of adepts chief among them. This is reflected directly in her references to a worldwide "brotherhood" of occult adepts.

== Critical reception ==
Historian Ronald H. Fritze notes that:

[Blavatsky] claimed to have received her information during trances in which the Masters of Mahatmas of Tibet communicated with her and allowed her to read from the ancient Book of Dzyan. The Book of Dzyan was supposedly composed in Atlantis using the lost language of Senzar but the difficulty is that no scholar of ancient languages in the 1880s or since has encountered the slightest passing reference to the Book of Dzyan or the Senzar language.
