= Book of Dzyan =

Theosophical book

The Book of Dzyan (comprising the Stanzas of Dzyan) is a reputedly ancient text of Tibetan origin. The Stanzas formed the basis for The Secret Doctrine (1888), one of the foundational works of the theosophical movement, by Helena Petrovna Blavatsky. The book has influenced writers in the ancient astronaut, occult and UFO communities. Historians and skeptics have dismissed the Book of Dzyan as a hoax and have accused Blavatsky of plagiarism.

== Madame Blavatsky's claims regarding the Book of Dzyan ==
Madame Blavatsky claimed to have seen a manuscript of the Book of Dzyan while studying esoteric lore in Tibet. She claimed this and other ancient manuscripts were safeguarded from profane eyes by the initiates of an Occult Brotherhood. The work had originally, according to Blavatsky, been written in the sacred language of Senzar, a language unknown to philology. She wrote:

This first installment of the esoteric doctrines is based upon Stanzas, which are the records of a people unknown to ethnology; it is claimed that they are written in a tongue absent from the nomenclature of languages and dialects with which philology is acquainted; they are said to emanate from a source (Occultism) repudiated by science; and, finally, they are offered through an agency, incessantly discredited before the world by all those who hate unwelcome truths, or have some special hobby of their own to defend. Therefore, the rejection of these teachings may be expected, and must be accepted beforehand. No one styling himself a "scholar," in whatever department of exact science, will be permitted to regard these teachings seriously.

In 1909, Theosophist Charles Webster Leadbeater stated that the Book of Dzyan possesses occult qualities:

It appears to be very highly magnetized, for as soon as a man takes a page into his hand he sees passing before his eyes a vision of the events which it is intended to portray, while at the same time he seems to hear a sort of rhythmic description of them in his own language, so far as that language will convey the ideas involved. Its pages contain no words whatever – nothing but symbols.

Others have been skeptical. Max Müller is reported to have said that ‘in this matter she was either a remarkable forger or that she has made the most valuable gift to archeological research in the Orient.’

== The Book of Dzyan and the Buddhist Tantras ==
In other references Blavatsky claimed the Book of Dzyan belonged to a group of Tibetan esoteric writings known as the Books of Kiu-Te. Blavatsky wrote before a standard transcription of Tibetan into the Latin alphabet had been agreed upon; it took David Reigle some time to establish that she was referring to what modern scholars write as rGyud-sde (gyü de, section of tantras) parts of a voluminous Buddhist corpus commonly referred to as the Tantras.

Other researchers have suggested a source in Chinese Taoism or Jewish Kabbalah.

In Isis Unveiled Blavatsky herself identifies Senzar as being "ancient Sanskrit" (Isis, I, 440). As noted by John Algeo in his book, Blavatsky's other statements about Senzar (including the above linkage to Sanskrit) create a number of puzzles, which make it difficult to take the etymological language family references literally, since some link to Egyptian sources, while yet others are still of other roots.

== The Stanzas of Dzyan in the works of other authors ==
Supposed verses from the same Stanzas of Dzyan were later published by Alice Bailey in A Treatise on Cosmic Fire in 1925. Bailey claimed these verses had been dictated to her telepathically by the Tibetan Master Djwal Kul.

Swiss author Erich von Däniken claimed to have explored some of the book's content and its alleged history, reporting unsourced rumours that the first version of the book predates Earth, and that chosen people who simply touch the book will receive visions of what it describes. Other ancient astronaut and theosophist writers have alleged that the Book of Dzyan originated on another planet.

References to the Stanzas exist in the fiction of H. P. Lovecraft, for example in his short story "The Haunter of the Dark". However, Lovecraft did not believe that the Stanzas had any factual basis and only used it as material for his fiction books.

== Criticism regarding the sources of the Stanzas of Dzyan ==
Orientalist William Emmette Coleman undertook a complete exegesis of Blavatsky's writings. He found that her main sources were H.H. Wilson's translations of the Vishnu Purana; Alexander Winchell’s World Life: or, Contemporary Geology; Ignatius Donnely’s Atlantis: The Antediluvian World (1882); and other contemporary scientific and occult works, plagiarized without credit and, in his own opinion, used in a blundering manner that showed superficial acquaintance with the subjects under discussion. He further claimed that she took at least part of her Stanzas of Dzyan from the Hymn of Creation in the old Sanskrit Rig-Veda. Coleman promised a book that would expose all of H.P.B.’s sources including that of the word Dzyan. The reason Coleman's book never appeared is that “Coleman lost his library and his notes in the 1906 San Francisco earthquake and died three years later, his book unwritten”.

René Guénon argued that Blavatsky based the Book of Dzyan on fragments of the Tibetan Kanjur and Tanjur, published in Calcutta in the twentieth volume of Asiatic Researches, in 1836.

Historian Ronald H. Fritze notes that:

[Blavatsky] claimed to have received her information during trances in which the Masters of Mahatmas of Tibet communicated with her and allowed her to read from the ancient Book of Dzyan. The Book of Dzyan was supposedly composed in Atlantis using the lost language of Senzar but the difficulty is that no scholar of ancient languages in the 1880s or since has encountered the slightest passing reference to the Book of Dzyan or the Senzar language.

Jason Colavito has dismissed the book as a hoax and has noted that "even after skeptics debunked her Book of Dzyan as a fraud, her followers continued to assert its reality."

== See also ==
- Fake science
- False history
- Paranormal
