= David Reigle =

American scholar and author

- Born: August 22, 1952; Danville, Pennsylvania, U.S.
- Occupations: Scholar and writer

David Reigle (August 22, 1952 in Danville, Pennsylvania) is an American author and an independent scholar of the Sanskrit scriptures of India and their Tibetan translations. He has written on the Buddhist Kālacakra teachings, and has published research on the sourcebooks accepted in Theosophy. These are the Books of Kiu-te, i.e., rgyud-sde, the Tibetan Buddhist tantras, and the so-called Book of Dzyan, which still remains unidentified.

== Early life ==
David Reigle became interested in Theosophy in 1973. Although he began his Sanskrit studies at the University of California, Santa Barbara, in 1978, he did not pursue a PhD, but rather continued his Sanskrit studies independently. He began his Tibetan studies with a private tutor in Dharamsala, India, in 1979. While working on Sanskrit texts, he identified two very rare Sanskrit verb-forms and wrote an article about them that was published in the Indo-Iranian Journal.

== Work ==
=== The Books of Kiu-te ===
The Books of Kiu-te are said by Theosophical founder Helena Petrovna Blavatsky to be a series of texts, some of which are secret, and others public. The secret ones are said to include the Book of Dzyan, from which stanzas were allegedly translated by Blavatsky to form the basis of her major book, The Secret Doctrine (2 vols., 1888). The public ones, said to be in the possession of Tibetan monasteries, long remained unidentified. In 1981, Reigle identified them as rgyud-sde, the Tibetan Buddhist tantras, by tracing out the reference Blavatsky gave when referring to these books. Then unknown to Reigle, Henk J. Spierenburg had made this identification six years earlier in a note to an article he wrote in Dutch. Reigle followed up this identification with a small book, The Books of Kiu-te, or the Tibetan Buddhist Tantras: A Preliminary Analysis, published in 1983. This book surveys the Buddhist tantras as found in Tibetan translation in the Tibetan Kangyur and their commentaries as found in the Tibetan Tengyur, and includes a bibliography of the then available printed editions of their Sanskrit originals. It was reviewed in Journal of the International Association of Buddhist Studies.

=== Kālacakra ===
Reigle received the Kalachakra Initiation from the Dalai Lama in Madison, Wisconsin, in 1981, the first time it was given in the West. Immediately thereafter he began working with Sanskrit manuscripts of the then unpublished great commentary on the Kālacakra-tantra, the Vimalaprabhā. In 1986 he published a pamphlet, The Lost Kālacakra Mūla Tantra on the Kings of Śambhala, in which he edited from eight Sanskrit manuscripts a quotation giving the names of the kings of Śambhala. A small book by Reigle was published in 1996, titled Kālacakra Sādhana and Social Responsibility. Drawing on statements by the Dalai Lama, this book says that the Kālacakra practice or sādhana benefits not only the individual practitioner, but society as a whole. In 1998 he and Andy Wistreich co-founded the International Kalachakra Network. This has become a major internet source on Kālacakra. He contributed an essay to As Long as Space Endures: Essays on the Kālacakra Tantra in Honor of H.H. the Dalai Lama, 2009. In 2012 his lengthy review article, The Kālacakra Tantra on the Sādhana and Maṇḍala, was published in Journal of the Royal Asiatic Society.

=== The Book of Dzyan ===
Much of Reigle's research has been directed toward attempting to trace the so-called Book of Dzyan, the source from which Blavatsky translated stanzas on cosmogenesis and anthropogenesis that form the basis of her major book, The Secret Doctrine. Papers on the Book of Dzyan and the Books of Kiu-te were presented at three Secret Doctrine conferences in 1984, 1988, and 1998. Four Book of Dzyan Research Reports were issued 1995–1997. These seven are included among fourteen papers published in 1999 in a book co-authored with his wife Nancy, Blavatsky's Secret Books: Twenty Years’ Research. A blog dedicated solely to the Book of Dzyan and the quest for it was started in Feb. 2012. He has recently summarized his research in an article, The Book of Dzyan: The Current State of the Evidence, in which he writes: “I have come across significant circumstantial evidence in favor of the authenticity of the Book of Dzyan.”

== Publications ==
- The Books of Kiu-te, or the Tibetan Buddhist Tantras: A Preliminary Analysis. San Diego: Wizards Bookshelf, 1983
- The Lost Kālacakra Mūla Tantra on the Kings of Śambhala, Talent, Oregon: Eastern School, 1986
- Kālacakra Sādhana and Social Responsibility, Santa Fe: Spirit of the Sun Publications, 1996
- The ‘Virtually Unknown’ Benedictive Middle in Classical Sanskrit: Two Occurrences in the Buddhist Abhisamayālaṅkāra, Indo-Iranian Journal, vol. 40, no. 2, April 1997, pp. 119–123
- Blavatsky's Secret Books: Twenty Years’ Research, co-author Nancy Reigle, San Diego: Wizards Bookshelf, 1999
- Sanskrit Mantras in the Kālacakra Sādhana, in As Long as Space Endures: Essays on the Kālacakra Tantra in Honor of H.H. the Dalai Lama, 2009, pp. 301–315
- The Kālacakra Tantra on the Sādhana and Maṇḍala, Journal of the Royal Asiatic Society, series 3, vol. 22, no. 2, 2012, pp. 439–463
- The Book of Dzyan: The Current State of the Evidence, Brahmavidyā: The Adyar Library Bulletin, vol. 77, 2013
- Studies in the Wisdom Tradition, co-author Nancy Reigle, Eastern School Press, 2015
