= Isis Unveiled =

Key text in the Theosophical movement

Isis Unveiled: A Master-Key to the Mysteries of Ancient and Modern Science and Theology
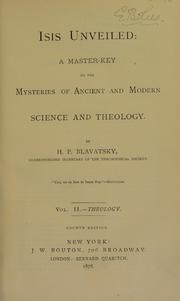
- First edition titlepage
- Author: Helena Petrovna Blavatsky
- Language: English
- Subject: Esoteric philosophy
- Genre: Non-fiction
- Published: 1877
- Publisher: Theosophical Society
- Publication place: United States
- Media type: Print

Isis Unveiled: A Master-Key to the Mysteries of Ancient and Modern Science and Theology, published in 1877, is a book of esoteric philosophy and Helena Petrovna Blavatsky's first major self-published major work text and a key doctrine in her self-founded Theosophical movement.

The work has often been criticized as a plagiarized occult work, with scholars noting how Blavatsky extensively copied from many sources popular among occultists at the time. Isis Unveiled is nevertheless also understood by modern scholars to be a milestone in the history of Western esotericism.

== Overview ==
The work was originally entitled The Veil of Isis, a title which remains on the heading of each page, but had to be renamed once Blavatsky discovered that this title had already been used for an 1861 Rosicrucian work by W. W. Reade. Isis Unveiled is divided into two volumes. Volume I, The "Infallibility" of Modern Science, discusses occult science and the hidden and unknown forces of nature, exploring such subjects as forces, elementals, psychic phenomena, and the Inner and Outer Man. Volume II, Theology, discusses the similarity of Christian scripture to Eastern religions such as Buddhism, Hinduism, the Vedas, and Zoroastrianism. It follows the Renaissance notion of prisca theologia, in that all these religions purportedly descend from a common source; the ancient "Wisdom-Religion". Blavatsky writes in the preface that Isis Unveiled is "a plea for the recognition of the Hermetic philosophy, the anciently universal Wisdom-Religion, as the only possible key to the Absolute in science and theology."

Isis Unveiled is argued by many modern scholars such as Bruce F. Campbell and Nicholas Goodrick-Clarke to be a milestone in the history of Western Esotericism. Blavatsky gathered a number of themes central to the occult tradition—perennial philosophy, a Neo-Platonic emanationist cosmology, adepts, esoteric Christianity—and reinterpreted them in relation to current developments in science and new knowledge of non-Western faiths. In doing so, Isis Unveiled reflected many contemporary controversies—such as Darwin's theories on evolution and their impact on religion—and engaged in a discussion that appealed to intelligent individuals interested in religion but alienated from conventional Western forms. Blavatsky's combination of original insights, backed by scholarly and scientific sources, accomplished a major statement of modern occultism's defiance of materialist science.

In later theosophical works some of the doctrines originally stated in Isis Unveiled appeared in a significantly altered form, (Note: This shift in thought is marked by Blavatsky and the Theosophical Society's move eastward to India.) drawing out confusion among readers and even causing some to perceive contradiction. Specifically, the few and—according to many—ambiguous statements on reincarnation as well as the threefold conception of man as body, soul and spirit of Isis Unveiled stand in contrast to the elaborate and definite conception of reincarnation as well as the sevenfold conception of man in The Secret Doctrine (1888). Blavatsky later asserted the correctness of her statements on reincarnation and the constitution of man in Isis Unveiled, attributing the resulting confusion and alleged contradictions to the more superficial or simplified conceptions of the ideas in Isis Unveiled compared to those of later works. (Note: In the article Theories about Reincarnation and Spirits Blavatsky elaborately addressed the confusion related to the statements on reincarnation of Isis Unveiled, stating in particular that: "[… T]he doctrine [of reincarnation] is maintained now as it was then. Moreover, there is no 'discrepancy' but only incompleteness — hence, misconceptions arising from later teachings".) (Note: In The Key to Theosophy Blavatsky explains that the sevenfold conception of man is the threefold conception of man, refined. In section 6, Theosophical Teachings as to Nature and Man, under the heading The Septenary Nature of Man it is asked: "Is it what we call Spirit and Soul, and the man of flesh?", to which is replied: "It is not. That is the old Platonic division. Plato was an Initiate, and therefore could not go into forbidden details; but he who is acquainted with the archaic doctrine finds the seven in Plato's various combinations of Soul and Spirit.".)

Modern Theosophists hold the book as a revealed work dictated to Blavatsky by Theosophy's Masters.

== Critical reception ==
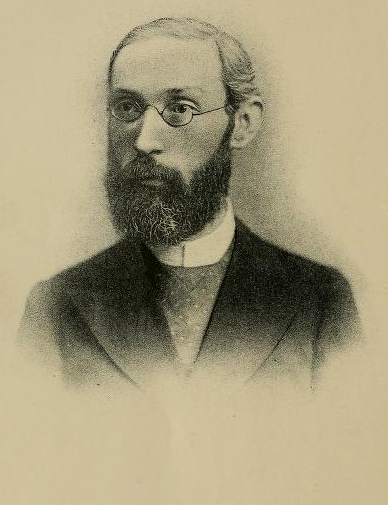
William Emmette Coleman

Detractors often accuse the book of extensive plagiarism, a view first seriously put forth by William Emmette Coleman shortly after publication and still expressed by modern scholars such as Mark Sedgwick. Similarly, historian Geoffrey Ashe noted that Isis Unveiled combines "comparative religion, occultism, pseudoscience, and fantasy in a mélange that shows genuine if superficial research but is not free from unacknowledged borrowing and downright plagiarism." Indeed, Isis Unveiled makes use of many sources popular among occultists at the time, often directly copying significant amounts of text. Scholars such as Bruce Campbell note plagiarism "on a large scale", but rather than dwelling on it, argue: "Blavatsky was a person who had an original set of insights but who lacked the literary skills and knowledge of English sufficient to create a work on her own. Relying on written sources and help from friends, she formulated a unique and powerful expression of occult ideas." Modern copies of Isis Unveiled are often annotated, fully delineating Blavatsky's sources and influences.

Historian Ronald H. Fritze considers Isis Unveiled to be a work of pseudohistory. Likewise, Henry R. Evans, a contemporaneous journalist and magician, described the book as a "hodge-podge of absurdities, pseudo-science, mythology and folk-lore, arranged in helter-skelter fashion, with an utter disregard of logical sequence."

One of Blavatsky's original goals in writing Isis Unveiled and founding the Theosophical Society was to reconcile contemporary advances in science with occultism, and this synthesis was one of the main appeals of Blavatsky's work for individuals interested in religion but alienated from conventional Western forms at the time.

K. Paul Johnson has suggested that many of the more mythical elements of Blavatsky's works, like her later Masters, rather than being outright inventions, were reformulations of preexisting esoteric ideas and the casting of a large group of individuals—who helped, encouraged, or collaborated with her—under a mythological context; all driven by Blavatsky's search for spiritual truth.

Sten Bodvar Liljegren notes that in addition to contemporaneous occult sources and the prevailing orientalism of the period, the novels of Edward Bulwer-Lytton heavily influenced Blavatsky's Theosophical ideas.

== See also ==
- Spiritism
- Theosophy and Christianity
- Veil of Isis
