= Helena Blavatsky =

Russian-American mystic and writer (1831–1891)

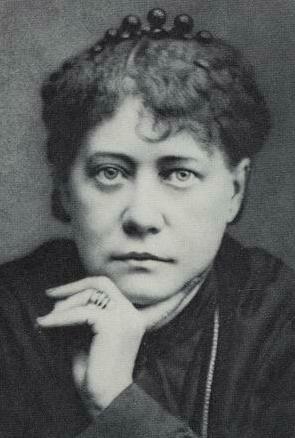
- Blavatsky in 1877
- Born: Yelena Petrovna von Hahn; 12 August [O.S. 31 July] 1831; Yekaterinoslav, Russian Empire
- Died: 8 May 1891 (aged 59); London, England
- Citizenship: Russian Empire (until 1878); U.S. (from 1878)

Philosophical work
- Era: Modern philosophy; 19th-century philosophy
- Region: Russian philosophy
- School: Theosophy
- Institutions: Theosophical Society
- Main interests: Mysticism; Religion
- Notable works: Isis Unveiled (1877); The Secret Doctrine (1888)
- Notable ideas: Causeless cause; Masters of the Ancient Wisdom; The Seven Shaktis (Devis Prakriti, Iccha, Jnana, Kriya, Kundalini, Mantrika, Para); Theosophical mysticism

Helena Petrovna Blavatsky (Note: Russian: Еле́на Петро́вна Блава́тская, romanized: Yelena Petrovna Blavatskaya, Ukrainian: Олена Петрівна Блаватська, romanized: Olena Petrivna Blavatska) (née Hahn von Rottenstern; 12 August [O.S. 31 July] 1831 – 8 May 1891), often known as Madame Blavatsky, was a Russian and American mystic and writer who co-founded the Theosophical Society in 1875. She gained an international following as the primary founder of Theosophy as a belief system.

Born into an aristocratic family in Yekaterinoslav, Russian Empire, Blavatsky traveled widely around the empire as a child. Largely self-educated, she developed an interest in Western esotericism during her teenage years. According to her later claims, in 1849 she embarked on a series of world travels, visiting Europe, the Americas, and India. She also claimed that during this period she encountered a group of spiritual adepts, the "Masters of the Ancient Wisdom", who sent her to Shigatse, Tibet, where they trained her to develop a deeper understanding of the synthesis of religion, philosophy, and science.

Both contemporary critics and later biographers have argued that some or all of these foreign visits were fictitious, and that she spent this period in Europe. By the early 1870s, Blavatsky was involved in the Spiritualist movement. But while defending the genuine existence of Spiritualist phenomena, she argued against the mainstream Spiritualist idea that the entities contacted were the spirits of the dead. Relocating to the United States in 1873, she befriended Henry Steel Olcott. She rose to public attention as a spirit medium and drew accusations that she was a charlatan.

In 1875, in New York City, Blavatsky co-founded the Theosophical Society with Olcott and William Quan Judge. In 1877, she published Isis Unveiled, a book outlining her Theosophical world-view. Associating it closely with the esoteric doctrines of Hermeticism and Neoplatonism, Blavatsky described Theosophy as "the synthesis of science, religion and philosophy", and claimed it revived the "Ancient Wisdom" which underlay all the world's religions. In 1880, she and Olcott moved to India, where the Society tried to ally with the Arya Samaj, a Hindu reform movement. On 26 March 1882 Maharishi Dayananda spoke about the Humbuggery of the Theosophists. That same year, while in Ceylon, she and Olcott became the first people from the United States to formally convert to Buddhism.

Although opposed by the British colonial administration, Theosophy spread rapidly in India but experienced internal problems after Blavatsky was accused of producing fraudulent paranormal phenomena. In ailing health, in 1885 she returned to Europe, establishing the Blavatsky Lodge in London, where she met then student lawyer, Mahatma Gandhi. There she published The Secret Doctrine, a commentary on what she claimed were ancient Tibetan manuscripts, as well as two further books, The Key to Theosophy and The Voice of the Silence. She died of influenza in 1891.

Blavatsky was a controversial figure during her lifetime, championed by supporters as an enlightened sage and derided by critics as a charlatan. Her Theosophical doctrines influenced the spread of Hindu and Buddhist ideas in the West, as well as the development of Western esoteric currents like Ariosophy, Anthroposophy, and the New Age Movement.

== Early life ==
Developing a reliable account of Blavatsky's life has proved difficult for biographers because in later life she deliberately provided contradictory accounts and falsifications about her own past. Furthermore, very few of her own writings written before 1873 survive, meaning that biographers must rely heavily on these unreliable later accounts. The accounts of her early life provided by her family members have also been considered dubious by biographers.

=== Childhood: 1831–1849 ===
==== Birth and family background ====
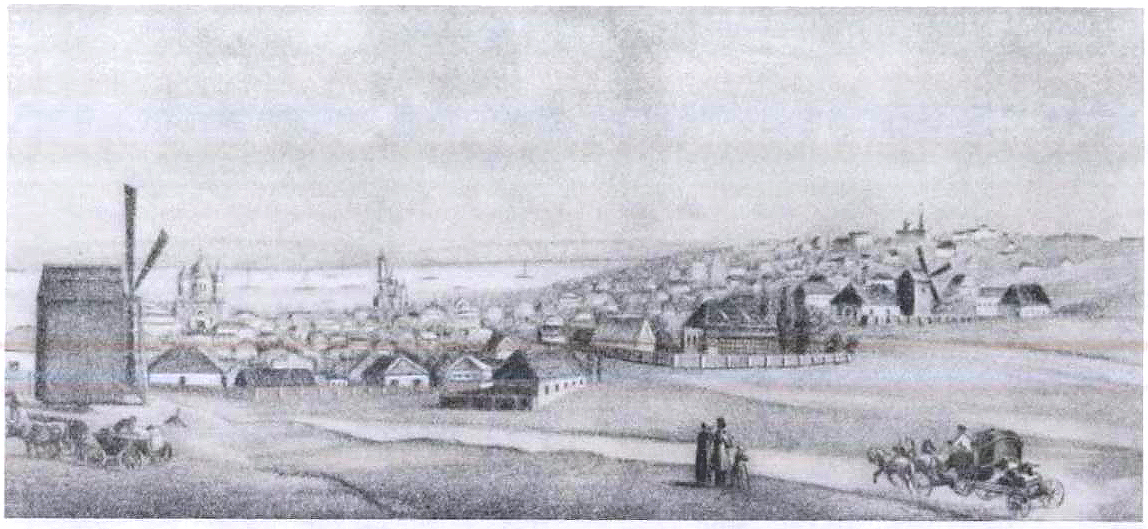
An illustration of Yekaterinoslav – Blavatsky's birthplace – as it appeared in the early 19th century

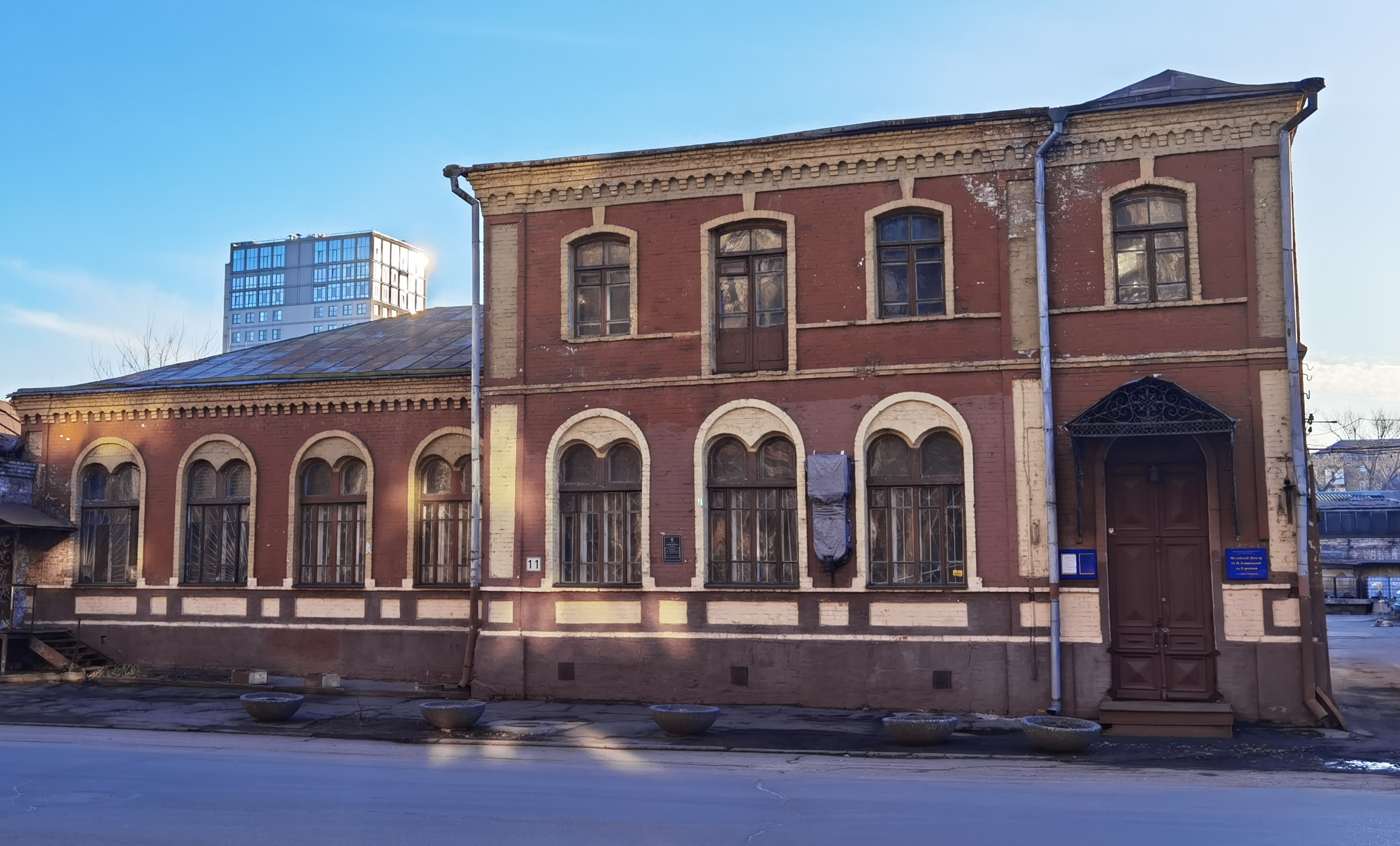
Birthplace and museum of Blavatsky in Dnipro, Ukraine

Blavatsky was born Helena Petrovna Hahn von Rottenstern in Yekaterinoslav, a town then part of the Russian Empire and now part of Ukraine. Her birth date was 12 August 1831, although according to the Julian calendar used in 19th-century Russia it was 31 July. Immediately after her birth, she was baptized into the Russian Orthodox Church. At the time, Yekaterinoslav was undergoing a cholera epidemic, and her mother contracted the disease shortly after childbirth; despite the expectations of their doctor, both mother and child survived the epidemic.

Blavatsky's family was aristocratic. Her mother was Helena Andreyevna Hahn von Rottenstern (Russian: Елена Андреевна Ган, 1814–1842; née Fadeyeva), a self-educated 17-year-old daughter of Princess Yelena Pavlovna Dolgorukaya, who was a similarly self-educated aristocrat. Blavatsky's father was Pyotr Alexeyevich Hahn von Rottenstern (Russian: Пётр Алексеевич Ган, 1798–1873), a descendant of the German Hahn aristocratic family, served as a captain in the Russian Royal Horse Artillery, later attaining the rank of colonel. Pyotr had not been present at his daughter's birth, having been in Poland fighting to suppress the November Uprising against Russian rule, and first saw her when she was six months old. As well as her Russian and German ancestry, Blavatsky could also claim French heritage, for a great-great grandfather had been a French Huguenot nobleman who had fled to Russia to escape persecution, there serving in the court of Catherine the Great.

As a result of Pyotr's career, the family frequently moved to different parts of the Empire, accompanied by their servants, a mobile childhood that may have influenced Blavatsky's largely nomadic lifestyle in later life. A year after Pyotr's arrival in Yekaterinoslav, the family relocated to the nearby army town of Romankovo. When Blavatsky was two years old, her younger brother, Sasha, died in another army town, after no medical help could be found. In 1835, mother and daughter moved to Odessa, where Blavatsky's maternal grandfather, Andrei Fadeyev, a civil administrator for the imperial authorities, had recently been posted. It was in this city that Blavatsky's sister Vera Petrovna was born.

==== St. Petersburg, Poltava, and Saratov ====
After a return to rural Ukraine, Pyotr was posted to Saint Petersburg, where the family moved in 1836. Blavatsky's mother liked the city, there establishing her own literary career, penning novels under the pseudonym of "Zenaida R-va" and translating the works of the English novelist Edward Bulwer-Lytton for Russian publication. When Pyotr returned to Ukraine c. 1837, she remained in the city. After Blavatsky's maternal grandfather Fadeyev was assigned to become a trustee for the Kalmyk people of Central Asia, Blavatsky and her mother accompanied him to Astrakhan, where they befriended a Kalmyk leader, Tumen. The Kalmyks were practitioners of Tibetan Buddhism, and it was here that Blavatsky gained her first experience with the religion.

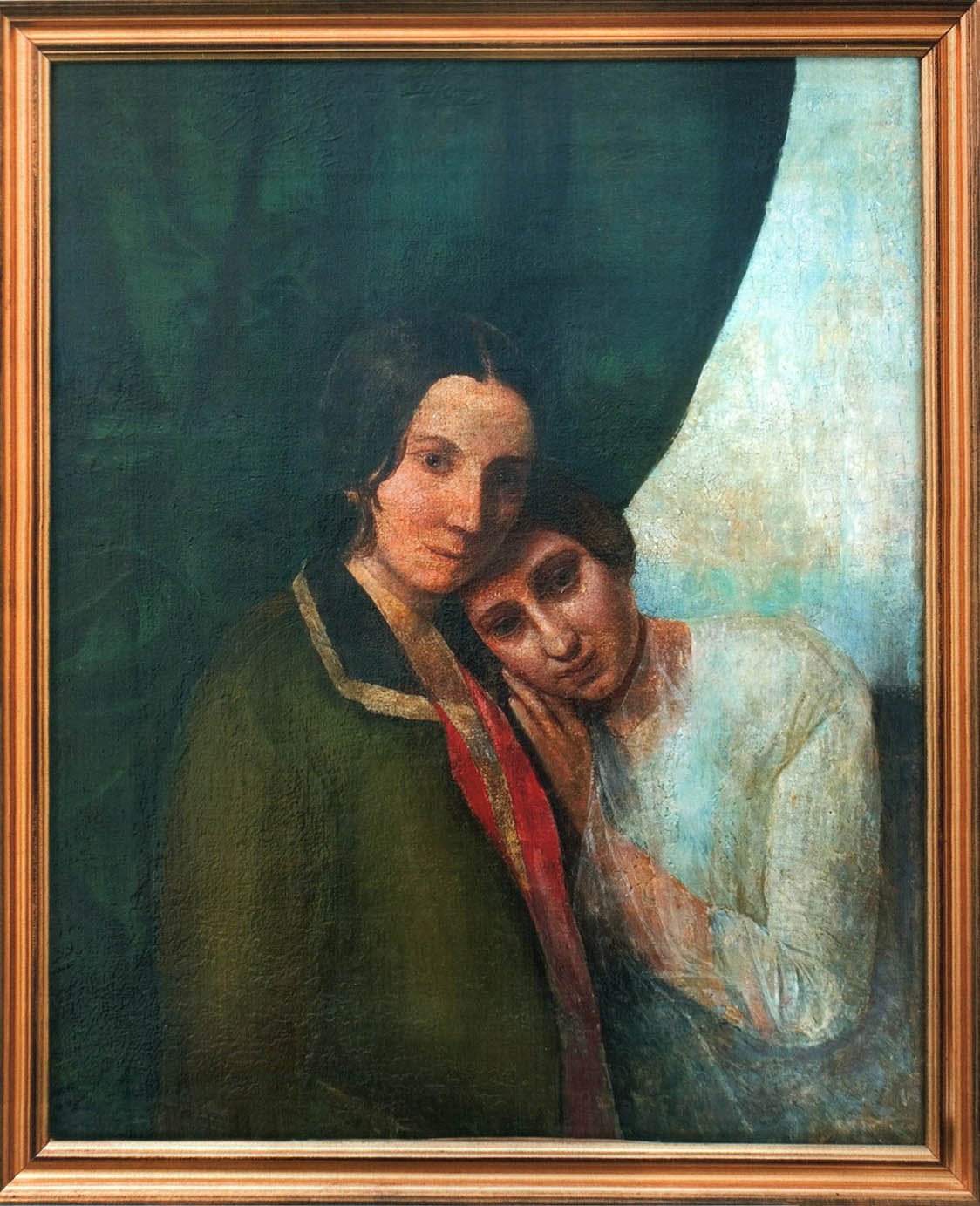
A painting of Blavatsky and her mother, titled "Two Helens (Helena Hahn and Helena Blavatsky)" 1844–1845

In 1838, Blavatsky's mother moved with her daughters to be with her husband at Poltava, where she taught Blavatsky how to play the piano and arranged for her to take dance lessons. Because of her poor health, Blavatsky's mother returned to Odessa, where Blavatsky learned English from a British governess. They next moved to Saratov, where a brother, Leonid, was born in June 1840. The family proceeded to Poland and then back to Odessa, where Blavatsky's mother died of tuberculosis in June 1842, aged 28.

The three surviving children were sent to live with their maternal grandparents in Saratov, where their grandfather Andrei had been appointed Governor of Saratov Governorate. The historian Richard Davenport-Hines described the young Blavatsky as "a petted, wayward, invalid child" who was a "beguiling story-teller". Accounts provided by relatives reveal that she socialized largely with lower-class children and that she enjoyed playing pranks and reading. She was educated in French, art, and music, all subjects designed to enable her to find a husband. With her grandparents she holidayed in Tumen's Kalmyk summer camp, where she learned horse riding and some Tibetan.

She later claimed that in Saratov she discovered the personal library of her maternal great-grandfather, Prince Pavel Vasilevich Dolgorukov (d. 1838). It contained a variety of books on esoteric subjects, encouraging her burgeoning interest. Dolgorukov had been initiated into Freemasonry in the late 1770s and had belonged to the Rite of Strict Observance. There were rumors that he had met both Alessandro Cagliostro and the Count of St. Germain. She also later stated that at this time of life she began to experience visions in which she encountered a "Mysterious Indian" man, which figure she claimed to actually meet in later life, in the flesh. Many biographers have considered this to be the first appearance of the "Masters" in her life story.

According to some of her later accounts, in 1844–45 Blavatsky was taken by her father to England, where she visited London and Bath. According to this story, in London she received piano lessons from the Bohemian composer Ignaz Moscheles, and performed with Clara Schumann. However, some Blavatsky biographers believe that this visit to Britain never took place, particularly as no mention of it is made in her sister's memoirs. After a year spent living with her aunt, Yekaterina Andreyevna Witte, mother of the future first Prime Minister of the Russian Empire, Sergei Witte, she moved to Tiflis, Georgia. There her grandfather Andrei had been appointed director of state lands in Transcaucasia. Blavatsky claimed that here she established a friendship with Alexander Vladimirovich Golitsyn, a Russian Freemason and member of the Golitsyn family who encouraged her interest in esoteric matters. She would also claim that at this period she had further paranormal experiences, astral traveling, again encountering the "mysterious Indian" in visions.

=== World travels: 1849–1869 ===
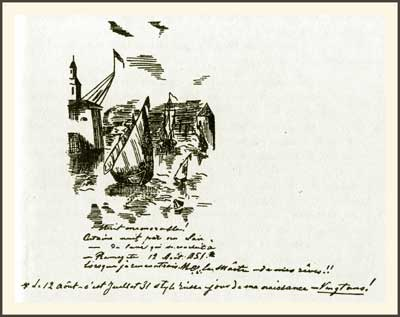
Blavatsky's drawing of a boat scene, produced in England in 1851

At age 17, she agreed to marry Nikifor Vladimirovich Blavatsky, a man in his forties who worked as Vice Governor of Erivan Province. Her reasons for doing so were unclear, although she later claimed that she was attracted by his belief in magic. Although she tried to back out shortly before the wedding ceremony, the marriage took place on 7 July 1849. Moving with him to the Sardar Palace, she made repeated unsuccessful attempts to escape and return to her family in Tiflis, to which he eventually relented. The family sent her, accompanied by a servant and maid, to Odessa to meet her father, who planned to return to Saint Petersburg with her. The escorts accompanied her to Poti and then Kerch, intending to continue with her to Odessa. Blavatsky claimed that, fleeing her escorts and bribing the captain of the ship that had taken her to Kerch, she reached Constantinople. This marked the start of nine years spent traveling the world, possibly financed by her father.

She did not keep a diary at the time, and was not accompanied by relatives who could verify her activities. Thus, historian of esotericism Nicholas Goodrick-Clarke noted that public knowledge of these travels rests upon "her own largely uncorroborated accounts", which are marred by being "occasionally conflicting in their chronology". For religious studies scholar Bruce F. Campbell, there was "no reliable account" for the next 25 years of her life. According to biographer Peter Washington, at this point "myth and reality begin to merge seamlessly in Blavatsky's biography".

She later claimed that in Constantinople she developed a friendship with a Hungarian opera singer named Agardi Metrovitch, whom she first encountered when saving him from being murdered. It was also in Constantinople that she met the Countess Sofia Kiselyova, who she would accompany on a tour of Egypt, Greece, and Eastern Europe. In Cairo, she met the American art student Albert Rawson, who later wrote extensively about the Middle East, and together they allegedly visited a Coptic magician, Paulos Metamon. In 1851, she proceeded to Paris, where she encountered the mesmerist, Victor Michal, who impressed her. From there, she visited England, and would claim that it was here that she met the "mysterious Indian" who had appeared in her childhood visions, a Hindu whom she referred to as the Master Morya. While she provided various conflicting accounts of how they met, locating it in both London and Ramsgate according to separate stories, she maintained that he claimed that he had a special mission for her, and that she must travel to Tibet.

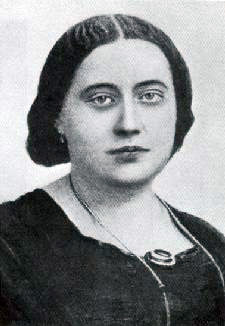
Helena Blavatsky, c. 1850

She made her way to Asia via the Americas, heading to Canada in autumn 1851. Inspired by the novels of James Fenimore Cooper, she sought out the Native American communities of Quebec in the hope of meeting their magico-religious specialists, but was instead robbed, later attributing these Natives' behavior to the corrupting influence of Christian missionaries. She then headed south, visiting New Orleans, Texas, Mexico, and the Andes, before transport via ship from the West Indies to Ceylon and then Bombay. She spent two years in India, allegedly following the instructions found in letters that Morya had sent to her. She attempted to enter Tibet, but was prevented from doing so by the British colonial administration.

She later claimed that she then headed back to Europe by ship, surviving a shipwreck near to the Cape of Good Hope before arriving in England in 1854, where she faced hostility as a Russian citizen due to the ongoing Crimean War between Britain and Russia. It was here, she claimed, that she worked as a concert musician for the Royal Philharmonic Society. Sailing to the U.S., she visited New York City, where she met up with Rawson, before touring Chicago, Salt Lake City, and San Francisco, and then sailing back to India via Japan. There, she spent time in Kashmir, Ladakh, and Burma, before making a second attempt to enter Tibet. She claimed that this time she was successful, entering Tibet in 1856 through Kashmir, accompanied by a Tartar shaman who was attempting to reach Siberia and who thought that as a Russian citizen, Blavatsky would be able to aid him in doing so. According to this account, they reached Leh before becoming lost, eventually joining a traveling Tartar group before she headed back to India. She returned to Europe via Madras and Java.

After spending time in France and Germany, in 1858 she returned to her family, then based in Pskov. She later claimed that there she began to exhibit further paranormal abilities, with rapping and creaking accompanying her around the house and furniture moving of its own volition. In 1860, she and her sister visited their maternal grandmother in Tiflis. It was there that she met up with Metrovitch, and where she reconciled with Nikifor in 1862. Together they adopted a child named Yuri, who would die aged five in 1867, when he was buried under Metrovitch's surname. In 1864, while riding in Mingrelia, Blavatsky fell from her horse and was in a coma for several months with a spinal fracture. Recovering in Tiflis, she claimed that upon awaking she gained full control of her paranormal abilities. She then proceeded to Italy, Transylvania, and Serbia, possibly studying the Cabalah with a rabbi at this point. In 1867, she proceeded to the Balkans, Hungary, and then Italy, where she spent time in Venice, Florence, and Mentana, claiming that in the latter she had been injured fighting for Giuseppe Garibaldi at the Battle of Mentana.

==== Tibet ====
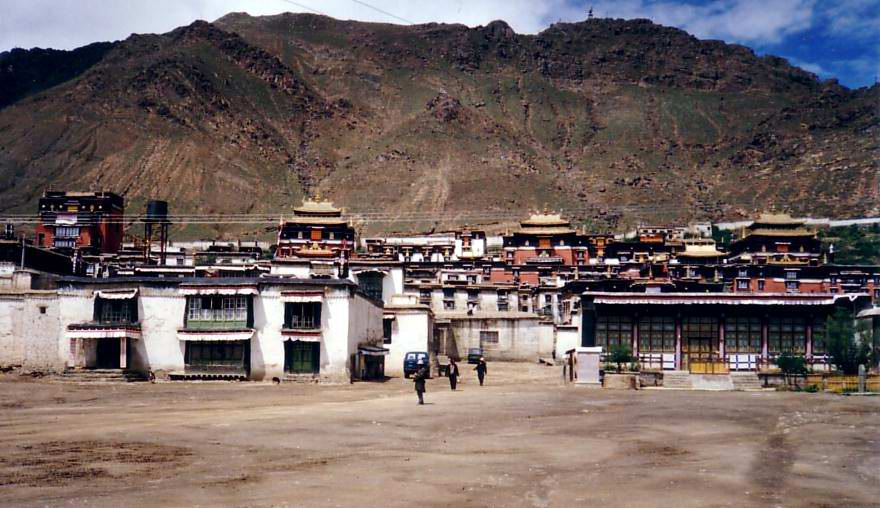
Tashilhunpo Monastery, Shigatse, the place that Blavatsky claimed held the Senzar texts she translated

She claimed to have then received a message from Morya to travel to Constantinople, where he met her, and together they traveled overland to Tibet, going through Turkey, Persia, Afghanistan, and then into India, entering Tibet via Kashmir. There, they allegedly stayed in the home of Morya's friend and colleague, Master Koot Hoomi, which was near to Tashilhunpo Monastery, Shigatse. According to Blavatsky, both Morya and Koot Hoomi were Kashmiris of Punjabi origin, and it was at his home that Koot Hoomi taught students of the Gelugpa sect of Tibetan Buddhism. Koot Hoomi was described as having spent time in London and Leipzig, being fluent in both English and French, and like Morya was a vegetarian.

She claimed that in Tibet, she was taught an ancient, unknown language known as Senzar, and translated a number of ancient texts written in this language that were preserved by the monks of a monastery; she stated that she was, however, not permitted entry into the monastery itself. She also claimed that while in Tibet, Morya and Koot Hoomi helped her develop and control her psychic powers. Among the abilities that she ascribed to these "Masters" were clairvoyance, clairaudience, telepathy, and the ability to control another's consciousness, to dematerialize and rematerialize physical objects, and to project their astral bodies, thus giving the appearance of being in two places at once. She claimed to have remained on this spiritual retreat from late 1868 until late 1870. Blavatsky never claimed in print to have visited Lhasa, although this is a claim that would be made for her in various later sources, including the account provided by her sister.

Many critics and biographers have expressed doubt about the veracity of Blavatsky's claims regarding her visits to Tibet, which rely entirely on her own claims, lacking any credible independent testimony. It has been highlighted that during the nineteenth century, Tibet was closed to Europeans, and visitors faced the perils of bandits and a harsh terrain; the latter would have been even more problematic if Blavatsky had been as stout and unathletic as she would be in later life. However, as several biographers have noted, traders and pilgrims from neighboring lands were able to access Tibet freely, suggesting the possibility that she would have been allowed to enter accompanied by Morya, particularly if she had been mistaken for an Asian. Blavatsky's eyewitness account of Shigatse was unprecedented in the West, and one scholar of Buddhism, D. T. Suzuki, suggested that she later exhibited an advanced knowledge of Mahayana Buddhism consistent with her having studied in a Tibetan monastery. Lachman noted that had Blavatsky spent time in Tibet, then she would be "one of the greatest travelers of the nineteenth century", although he added – "in all honesty I do not know" if Blavatsky spent time in Tibet or not. Biographer Marion Meade commented on Blavatsky's tales of Tibet and various other adventures by stating that "hardly a word of this appears to be true".

== Later life ==
=== Embracing Spiritualism and establishing Theosophy: 1870–1878 ===
==== Arriving in New York City ====
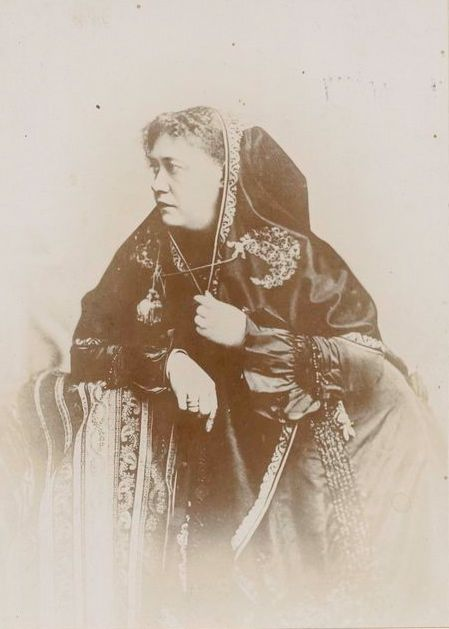
Blavatsky in 1875

Blavatsky alleged that she departed Tibet with the mission of proving to the world that the phenomena identified by Spiritualists were objectively real, thus defending Spiritualism against accusations of fraud. However, she also stated that the entities being contacted by Spiritualist mediums were not the spirits of the dead, as the Spiritualist movement typically alleged, but instead either mischievous elementals or the "shells" left behind by the deceased. She proceeded via the Suez Canal to Greece, where she met with another of the Masters, Master Hilarion. She set sail for Egypt aboard the SS Eunomia, but in July 1871 it exploded during the journey; Blavatsky was one of only 16 survivors. Reaching Cairo, she met up with Metamon, and with the help of a woman named Emma Cutting established a société spirite, which was based largely on Spiritism, a form of Spiritualism founded by Allan Kardec which professed a belief in reincarnation, in contrast to the mainstream Spiritualist movement. However, Blavatsky believed that Cutting and many of the mediums employed by the society were fraudulent, and she closed it down after two weeks. In Cairo, she also met with the Egyptologist Gaston Maspero, and another of the Masters, Serapis Bey. It was also here that she met up with Metrovitch, although he soon died of typhoid, with Blavatsky claiming to have overseen the funeral.

Leaving Egypt, she proceeded to Syria, Palestine, and Lebanon, there encountering members of the Druze religion. It was during these travels that she met with the writer and traveler Lidia Pashkova, who provided independent verification of Blavatsky's travels during this period. In July 1872 she returned to her family in Odessa, before departing in April 1873. She spent time in Bucharest and Paris, before – according to her later claims – Morya instructed her to go to the United States. Blavatsky arrived in New York City on 8 July 1873. There, she moved into a women's housing cooperative on Madison Street in Manhattan's Lower East Side, earning a wage through piece work sewing and designing advertising cards. It was here that she attracted attention, and was interviewed by the journalist Anna Ballard of the New York newspaper The Sun; this interview was the earliest textual source in which Blavatsky claimed to have spent time in Tibet. Indeed, it was while in New York that "detailed records" of Blavatsky's life again become available to historians. Soon after, Blavatsky received news of her father's death, thus inheriting a considerable fortune, allowing her to move into a lavish hotel. In December 1874, Blavatsky met the Georgian Mikheil Betaneli. Infatuated with her, he repeatedly requested that they marry, to which she ultimately relented; this constituted bigamy, as her first husband was still alive. However, as she refused to consummate the marriage, Betaneli sued for divorce and returned to Georgia.

==== Meeting Henry Steel Olcott and the foundation of the Theosophical Society ====
Blavatsky was intrigued by a news story about William and Horatio Eddy, brothers based in Chittenden, Vermont, who it was claimed could levitate and manifest spiritual phenomena. She visited Chittenden in October 1874, there meeting the reporter Henry Steel Olcott, who was investigating the brothers' claims for the Daily Graphic. Claiming that Blavatsky impressed him with her own ability to manifest spirit phenomena, Olcott authored a newspaper article on her. They soon became close friends, giving each other the nicknames of "Maloney" (Olcott) and "Jack" (Blavatsky). He helped attract greater attention to Blavatsky's claims, encouraging the Daily Graphic's editor to publish an interview with her, and discussing her in his book on Spiritualism, People from the Other World (1875), which her Russian correspondent Alexandr Aksakov urged her to translate into Russian. She began to instruct Olcott in her own occult beliefs, and encouraged by her he became celibate, tee-totaling, and vegetarian, although she herself was unable to commit to the latter. In January 1875 the duo visited the Spiritualist mediums Nelson and Jennie Owen in Philadelphia; the Owens asked Olcott to test them to prove that the phenomena that they produced were not fraudulent, and while Olcott believed them, Blavatsky opined that they faked some of their phenomena in those instances when genuine phenomena failed to manifest.

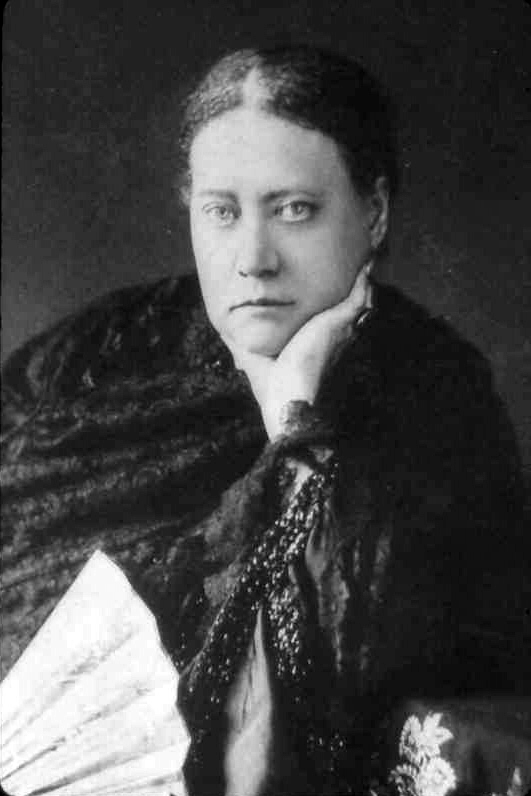
Blavatsky, c. 1877

Drumming up interest for their ideas, Blavatsky and Olcott published a circular letter in Eldridge Gerry Brown's Boston-based Spiritualist publication, The Spiritual Scientist. There, they named themselves the "Brotherhood of Luxor", a name potentially inspired by the pre-existing Hermetic Brotherhood of Luxor. They began living together in a series of rented apartments in New York City, which they decorated with taxidermied animals and images of spiritual figures; their life was funded largely by Olcott's continued work as a lawyer. Their last such apartment came to be known as the Lamasery. Allegedly encouraged by the Masters, Blavatsky and Olcott established the Miracle Club, through which they facilitated lectures on esoteric themes in New York City. It was through this group that they met an Irish Spiritualist, William Quan Judge, who shared many of their interests.

At a Miracle Club meeting on 7 September 1875, Blavatsky, Olcott, and Judge agreed to establish an esoteric organization, with Charles Sotheran suggesting that they call it the Theosophical Society. The term theosophy came from the Greek theos ("god(s)") and sophia ("wisdom"), thus meaning "god-wisdom" or "divine wisdom". The term was not new, but had been previously used in various contexts by the Philaletheians and the Christian mystic, Jakob Böhme. Theosophists would often argue over how to define Theosophy, with Judge expressing the view that the task was impossible. Blavatsky however insisted that Theosophy was not a religion in itself. Lachman has described the movement as "a very wide umbrella, under which quite a few things could find a place". On foundation, Olcott was appointed chairman, with Judge as secretary, and Blavatsky as corresponding secretary, although she remained the group's primary theoretician and leading figure. Prominent early members included Emma Hardinge Britten, Signor Bruzzesi, C.C. Massey, and William L. Alden; many were prominent and successful members of the establishment, although not all would remain members for long.

==== Isis Unveiled ====
The underlying theme among these diverse topics [in Isis Unveiled] is the existence of an ancient wisdom-religion, an ageless occult guide to the cosmos, nature and human life. The many faiths of man are said to derive from a universal religion known to both Plato and the ancient Hindu sages. The wisdom-religion is also identified with Hermetic philosophy as "the only possible key to the Absolute in science and theology" (I, vii). Every religion is based on the same truth or "secret doctrine", which contains "the alpha and omega of universal science" (I, 511). This ancient wisdom-religion will become the religion of the future (I, 613).

— Historian Nicholas Goodrick-Clarke, 2004.

In 1875, Blavatsky began work on a book outlining her Theosophical worldview, much of which would be written during a stay in the Ithaca home of Hiram Corson, a Professor of English Literature at Cornell University. Although she had hoped to call it The Veil of Isis, it would be published as Isis Unveiled. While writing it, Blavatsky claimed to be aware of a second consciousness within her body, referring to it as "the lodger who is in me", and stating that it was this second consciousness that inspired much of the writing. In Isis Unveiled, Blavatsky quoted extensively from other esoteric and religious texts, although her contemporary and colleague Olcott always maintained that she had quoted from books that she did not have access to. Writing more than a century after her death Lachman conjectured that if this had been the case, then she had had an eidetic memory, such that, while relying on earlier sources, the book represented an original synthesis that connected disparate ideas not brought together before.

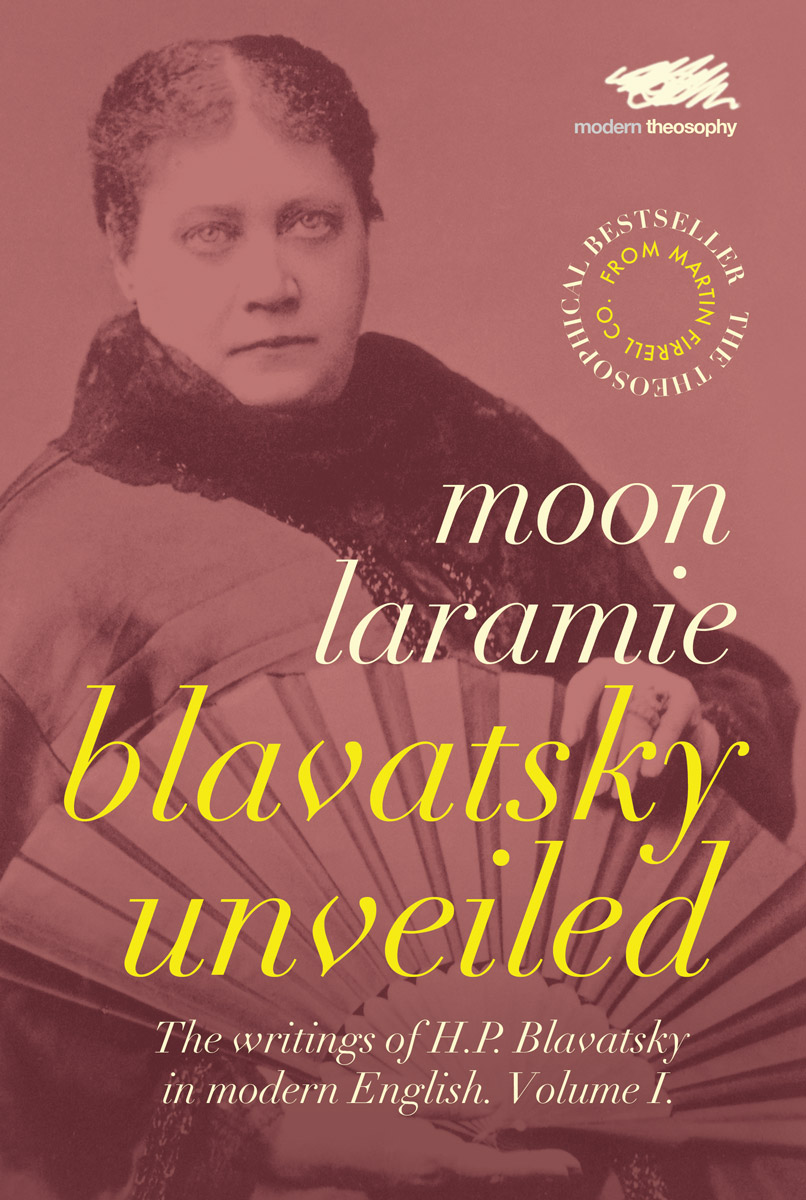
Cover of 'Blavatsky Unveiled', the first translation of Isis Unveiled into modern English.

Revolving around Blavatsky's idea that all the world's religions stemmed from a single "Ancient Wisdom", which she connected to the Western esotericism of ancient Hermeticism and Neoplatonism, it also articulated her thoughts on Spiritualism, and provided a criticism of Darwinian evolution, stating that it dealt only with the physical world and ignored the spiritual realms. The book was edited by Professor of Philosophy Alexander Wilder and published in two volumes by J.W. Bouton in 1877. Although facing negative mainstream press reviews, including from those who highlighted that it extensively quoted around 100 other books without acknowledgement, it proved to be such a commercial success, with its initial print run of 1,000 copies selling out in a week, that the publisher requested a sequel, although Blavatsky turned down the offer. While Isis Unveiled was a success, the Society remained largely inactive, having fallen into this state in autumn 1876. This was despite the fact that new lodges of the organization had been established throughout the U.S. and in London, and prominent figures like Thomas Edison and Abner Doubleday had joined. In July 1878, Blavatsky gained U.S. citizenship.

=== India: 1879–1885 ===
The Theosophical Society established links with an Indian Hindu reform movement, the Arya Samaj, which had been founded by the Swami Dayananda Saraswati; Blavatsky and Olcott believed that the two organizations shared a common spiritual world-view. Unhappy with life in the U.S., Blavatsky decided to move to India, with Olcott agreeing to join her, securing work as a U.S. trade representative to the country. In December, the duo auctioned off many of their possessions, although Edison gifted them a phonograph to take with them to India. They left New York City aboard the Canada, which took them to London. After meeting with well-wishers in the capital, they traveled to Liverpool, there setting sail aboard the Speke Hall, arriving in Bombay in February 1879. In the city, they were greeted with celebrations organized by Arya Samaj member Hurrychund Chintamon before obtaining a house in Girgaum Road, part of Bombay's native area.

Associating largely with Indians rather than the governing British elite, Blavatsky took a fifteen-year-old Gujarati boy, Vallah "Babula" Bulla, as her personal servant. Many educated Indians were impressed with the Theosophists championing of Indian religions, coming about during a period "of [India's] growing self-assertion against the values and beliefs" of the British Empire. Her activity in the city was monitored by British intelligence services, who suspected that she was working for Russia. In April, Blavatsky took Olcott, Babula, and their friend Moolji Thackersey to the Karla Caves, announcing that they contained secret passages that led to an underground place where the Masters assembled. Then claiming that the Masters were telepathically commanding her to head to Rajputana in the Punjab, she and Olcott headed north. At the Yamuna river, they met the sannyasin Babu Surdass, who had sat in the lotus position for 52 years, and in Agra saw the Taj Mahal. In Saharanpur they met with Dayananda and his Arya Samajists, before returning to Bombay.

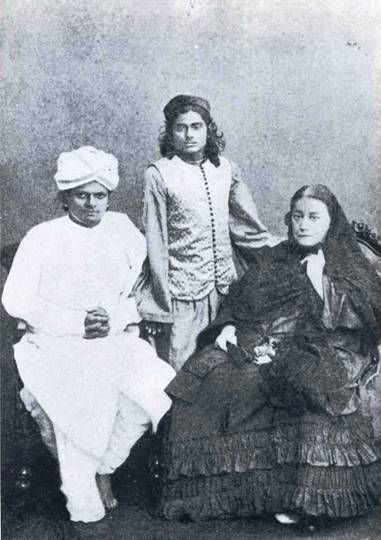
Blavatsky and Hindu Theosophists in India, c. 1884

In July 1879, Blavatsky and Olcott began work on a monthly magazine, The Theosophist, with the first issue coming out in October. The magazine soon obtained a large readership, with the management being taken over by Damodar K. Mavalankar, a Theosophist who introduced the idea of referring to the Masters as mahatmas. In December, Blavatsky and Olcott traveled to Allahabad, there visiting Alfred Percy Sinnett, the editor of The Pioneer and keen Spiritualist. A.O. Hume was also a guest at the Sinnett's home, and Blavatsky was encouraged to manifest paranormal phenomena in their presence. From there, they traveled to Benares, where they stayed at the palace of the Maharaja of Vizianagram. Blavatsky and Olcott were then invited to Ceylon by Buddhist monks. There they officially converted to Buddhism – apparently the first from the United States to do so. – taking the Five Precepts in a ceremony at Ramayana Nikayana in May 1880. Touring the island, they were met by crowds intrigued by these unusual Westerners who embraced Buddhism rather than proselytizing Christianity. Their message proved a boost to Sinhalese nationalist self-esteem, and they were invited to see the Buddha's Tooth in Kandy.

Upon learning that old comrade Emma Coulomb (née Cutting) and her husband had fallen into poverty in Ceylon, Blavatsky invited them to move into her home in Bombay. However, the Coulombs annoyed Rosa Bates and Edward Winbridge, two American Theosophists who were also living with Blavatsky; when Blavatsky took the side of the Coulombs, Bates and Winbridge returned to the U.S. Blavatsky was then invited to Simla to spend more time with Sinnett, and there performed a range of materializations that astounded the other guests; in one instance, she allegedly made a cup-and-saucer materialize under the soil during a picnic. Sinnett was eager to contact the Masters himself, convincing Blavatsky to facilitate this communication, resulting in the production of over 1400 pages allegedly authored by Koot Hoomi and Morya, which came to be known as the Mahatma Letters. Sinnett summarized the teachings contained in these letters in his book Esoteric Buddhism (1883), although scholars of Buddhism like Max Müller publicly highlighted that the contents were not Buddhist, and Blavatsky herself disliked the misleading title. Since the book's publication, there has been much debate as to the authenticity of the letters, with some arguing that they were written by Blavatsky herself, and others believing that they were written by separate individuals. According to Meade, "there can be no reasonable doubt that Helena was their author".

Theosophy was unpopular with both Christian missionaries and the British colonial administration, with India's English-language press being almost uniformly negative toward the Society. The group nevertheless proved popular, and branches were established across the country. While Blavatsky had emphasized its growth among the native Indian population rather than among the British elite, she moved into a comfortable bungalow in the elite Bombay suburb of Breach Candy, which she said was more accessible to Western visitors. Olcott had decided to establish the Buddhist Education Fund to combat the spread of the Christian faith in Ceylon and encourage pride and interest in Buddhism among the island's Sinhalese population. Although Blavatsky initially opposed the idea, stating that the Masters would not approve, Olcott's project proved a success, and she changed her opinion about it.

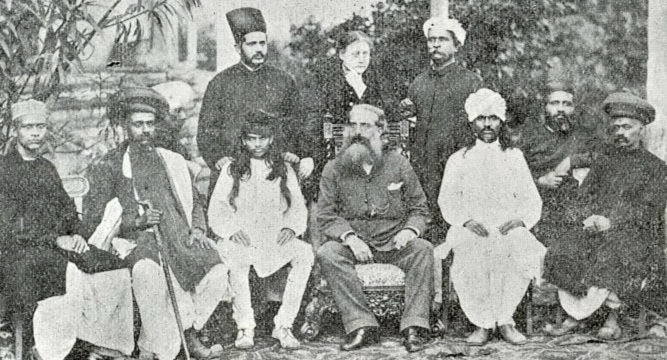
Blavatsky standing behind Olcott (middle seated) and Damodar Mavalankar (seated to his left), Bombay, 1881

Blavatsky had been diagnosed with Bright's disease and hoping the weather to be more conducive to her condition she took up the offer of the Society's Madras Branch to move to their city. However, in November 1882 the Society purchased an estate in Adyar, which became their permanent headquarters; a few rooms were set aside for Blavatsky, who moved into them in December. She continued to tour the subcontinent, claiming that she then spent time in Sikkim and Tibet, where she visited her teacher's ashram for several days. With her health deteriorating, she agreed to accompany Olcott on his trip to Britain, where he was planning to argue the case for Ceylonese Buddhism and sort out problems with the Society's London Lodge.

Sailing to Marseille, France, in March 1883, she spent time in Nice with the founder of the Theosophical Society's French branch, Marie Sinclair, Countess of Caithness (widow of James Sinclair, 14th Earl of Caithness), with whom she continued to Paris. In London, she appeared at the lodge's meeting, where she sought to quell arguments between Sinnett on the one hand and Anna Kingsford and Edward Maitland on the other. Unsatisfied, Kingsford – whom Blavatsky thought "an unbearable snobbish woman" – split from the Theosophical Society to form the Hermetic Society. In London, Blavatsky made contact with the Society for Psychical Research (SPR) through Frederic W. H. Myers. She complied with their request to undertake a study of her and the paranormal abilities that she claimed to possess, although wasn't impressed by the organization and mockingly referred to it as the "Spookical Research Society".

With Blavatsky in Europe, trouble broke out at the society's Adyar headquarters in what became known as the Coulomb Affair. The society's Board of Control had accused Emma Coulomb of misappropriating their funds for her own purposes, and asked her to leave their center. She and her husband refused, blackmailing the society with letters that they claimed were written by Blavatsky and which proved that her paranormal abilities were fraudulent. The society refused to pay them and expelled them from their premises, at which the couple turned to the Madras-based Christian College Magazine, who published an exposé of Blavatsky's alleged fraudulence using the Coulombs' claims as a basis. The story attracted international attention and was picked up by London-based newspaper, The Times. In response, in November 1884 Blavatsky headed to Cairo, where she and Theosophist Charles Webster Leadbeater searched for negative information on Emma Coulomb, discovering stories of her alleged former history of extortion and criminality. Internally, the Society was greatly damaged by the Coulomb Affair, although it remained popular in India, as did Blavatsky herself.

=== Final years in Europe: 1885–1891 ===
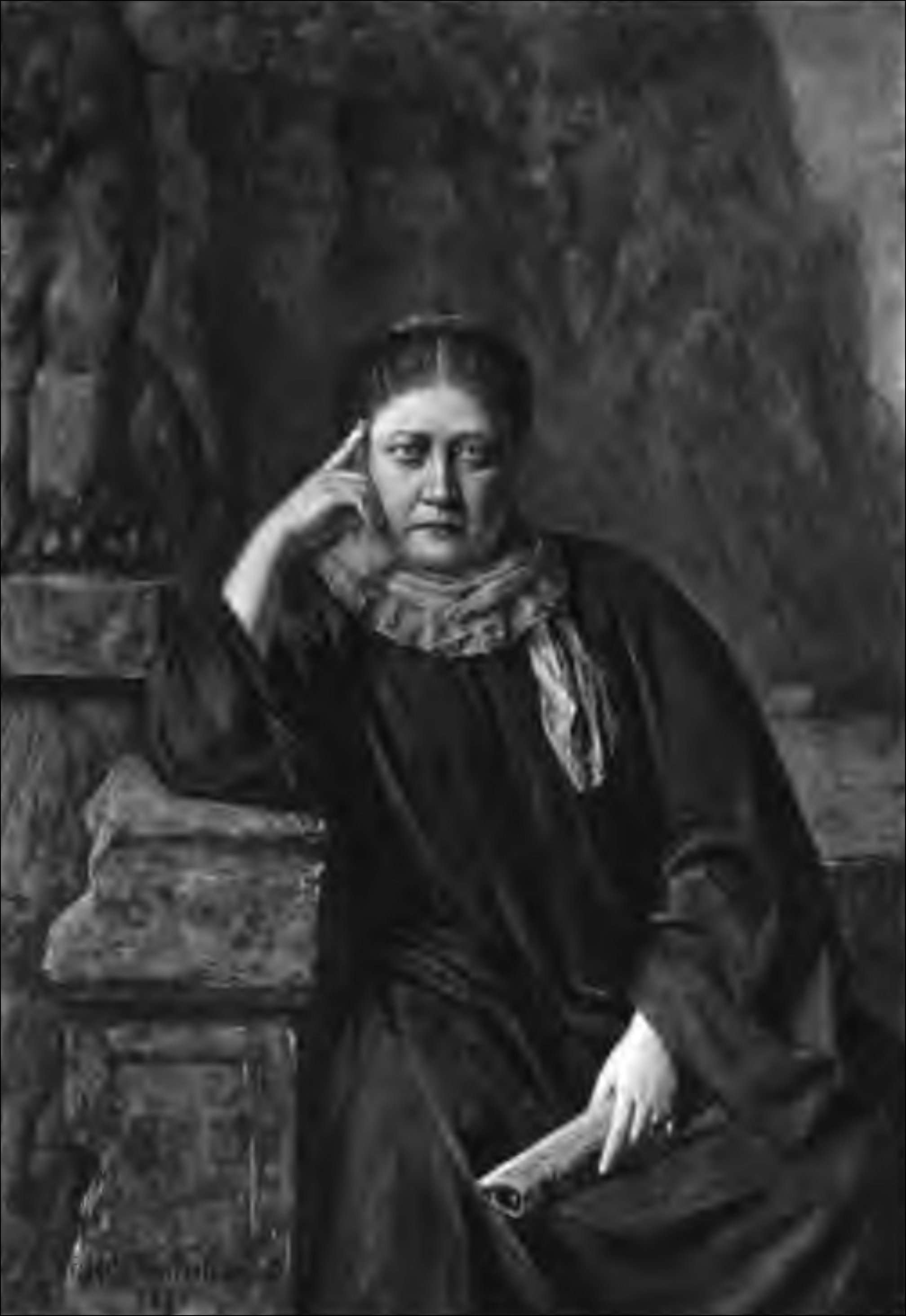
Mme. Blavatsky (painted by Hermann Schmiechen)

Worsening health led Blavatsky to contemplate a return to the milder climate of Europe, and resigning her position as corresponding secretary of the society, she left India in March 1885. By 1885, the Theosophical Society had experienced rapid growth, with 121 lodges having been chartered across the world, 106 of which were located in India, Burma, and Ceylon. Initially, each lodge was chartered directly from the Adyar headquarters, with members making democratic decisions by vote. However, over the coming years the lodges were organized into national units with their own ruling councils, resulting in tensions between the different levels of administration.

Settling in Naples, Italy, in April 1885, she began living off of a small Society pension and continued working on her next book, The Secret Doctrine. She then moved to Würzburg in the Kingdom of Bavaria, where she was visited by a Swedish Theosophist, the Countess Constance Wachtmeister, who became her constant companion throughout the rest of her life. In December 1885, the SPR published their report on Blavatsky and her alleged phenomena, authored by Richard Hodgson. In his report, Hodgson accused Blavatsky of being a spy for the Russian government, further accusing her of faking paranormal phenomena, largely on the basis of the Coulomb's claims. The report caused much tension within the Society, with a number of Blavatsky's followers – among them Babaji and Subba Row – denouncing her and resigning from the organization on the basis of it.

For our own part, we regard [Blavatsky] neither as the mouthpiece of hidden seers, nor as a mere vulgar adventuress; we think that she has achieved a title to permanent remembrance as one of the most accomplished, ingenious, and interesting imposters in history.

— The statement of the Society for Psychical Research on the basis of the Hodgson Report.

Blavatsky wanted to sue her accusers, although Olcott advised against it, believing that the surrounding publicity would damage the Society. In private letters, Blavatsky expressed relief that the criticism was focused on her and that the identity of the Masters had not been publicly exposed. For decades after, Theosophists criticized Hodgson's methodology, arguing that he set out to disprove and attack Blavatsky rather than conduct an unbiased analysis of her claims and abilities. In 1986 the SPR admitted this to be the case and retracted the findings of the report. However, Johnson has commented "Theosophists have overinterpreted this as complete vindication, when in fact many questions raised by Hodgson remain unanswered."

In 1886, by which time she was using a wheelchair, Blavatsky moved to Ostend in Belgium, where she was visited by Theosophists from across Europe. Among them was the doctor William Ashton Ellis, who treated her during a near-fatal illness in March 1887; Blavatsky credited him with saving her life. Supplementing her pension, she established a small ink-producing business. She received messages from members of the Society's London Lodge who were dissatisfied with Sinnett's running of it; they believed that he was focusing on attaining upper-class support rather than encouraging the promotion of Theosophy throughout society, a criticism Blavatsky agreed with. She arrived in London in May 1887, initially staying in the Upper Norwood home of Theosophist Mabel Collins. In September, she moved into the Holland Park home of fellow Theosophists, Bertram Keightley and his nephew Archibald Keightley.

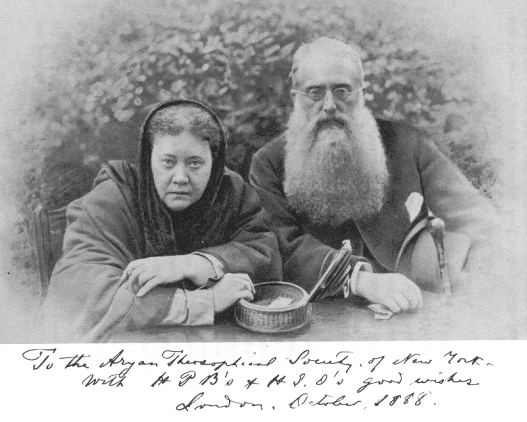
Blavatsky and Olcott in 1888

In London, she established the Blavatsky Lodge as a rival to that run by Sinnett, draining much of its membership. Lodge meetings were held at the Keightleys' house on Thursday nights, with Blavatsky also greeting many visitors there, among them the occultist and poet W. B. Yeats. In November 1889 she was visited by the Indian lawyer Mohandas Gandhi, who was studying the Bhagavad Gita with the Knightleys. He became an associate member of Blavatsky's Lodge in March 1891, and would emphasize the close connection between Theosophy and Hinduism throughout his life. In 1888, Blavatsky established the Esoteric Section of the Theosophical Society, a group under her complete control. Admittance was restricted to those who had passed certain tests. She identified it as a place for "true Theosophists" who would focus on the system's philosophy rather than experiment with producing paranormal phenomena.

=== Publishing ===
In London, Blavatsky founded a magazine, controversially titling it Lucifer; in this Theosophical publication she sought to completely ignore claims regarding paranormal phenomena, and focus instead on a discussion of philosophical ideas. Blavatsky also finished writing The Secret Doctrine, which was then edited by the Keightleys. As a commercial publisher willing to publish the approximately 1,500-page work could not be found, Blavatsky established the Theosophical Publishing Company, who brought out the work in two volumes, the first published in October 1888 and the second in January 1889. Blavatsky claimed that the book constituted her commentary on the Book of Dzyan, a religious text written in Senzar, which she had been taught while studying in Tibet. Buddhologist David Reigle claimed that he identified Books of Kiu-te, including Blavatsky's Book of Dzyan as a first volume, as the Tantra section of the Tibetan Buddhist canon. However, most scholars of Buddhism who have examined The Secret Doctrine have concluded that there was no such text as the Book of Dzyan, and that it was instead merely Blavatsky's invention. In the book, Blavatsky outlined her own cosmogonical ideas about how the universe, the planets, and the human species came to exist. She also discussed her views about human beings, the human soul, and issues relating to an afterlife.

== Annie Besant ==
The two-volume The Secret Doctrine was reviewed for The Pall Mall Gazette by the social reformer Annie Besant; impressed by it, Besant met with Blavatsky and joined the Theosophists. In August 1890, Blavatsky moved in to Besant's large house at 19 Avenue Road in St. John's Wood.

She appointed Besant to be the new head of the Blavatsky Lodge, and in July 1890 inaugurated the new European headquarters of the Theosophical Society in Besant's house. There, she authored a book of questions and answers, The Key to Theosophy. This was followed by The Voice of the Silence, a short devotional text which she claimed was based on a Senzar text known as The Book of the Golden Precepts. As with The Secret Doctrine, most scholars of Buddhism have doubted that this latter text was an authentic Tibetan Buddhist document. She continued to face accusations of fraud; U.S. newspaper The Sun published a July 1890 article based on information provided by an ex-member of the Society, Elliott Coues. Blavatsky sued the newspaper for libel, and they publicly retracted their accusations in September 1892.

== Death ==
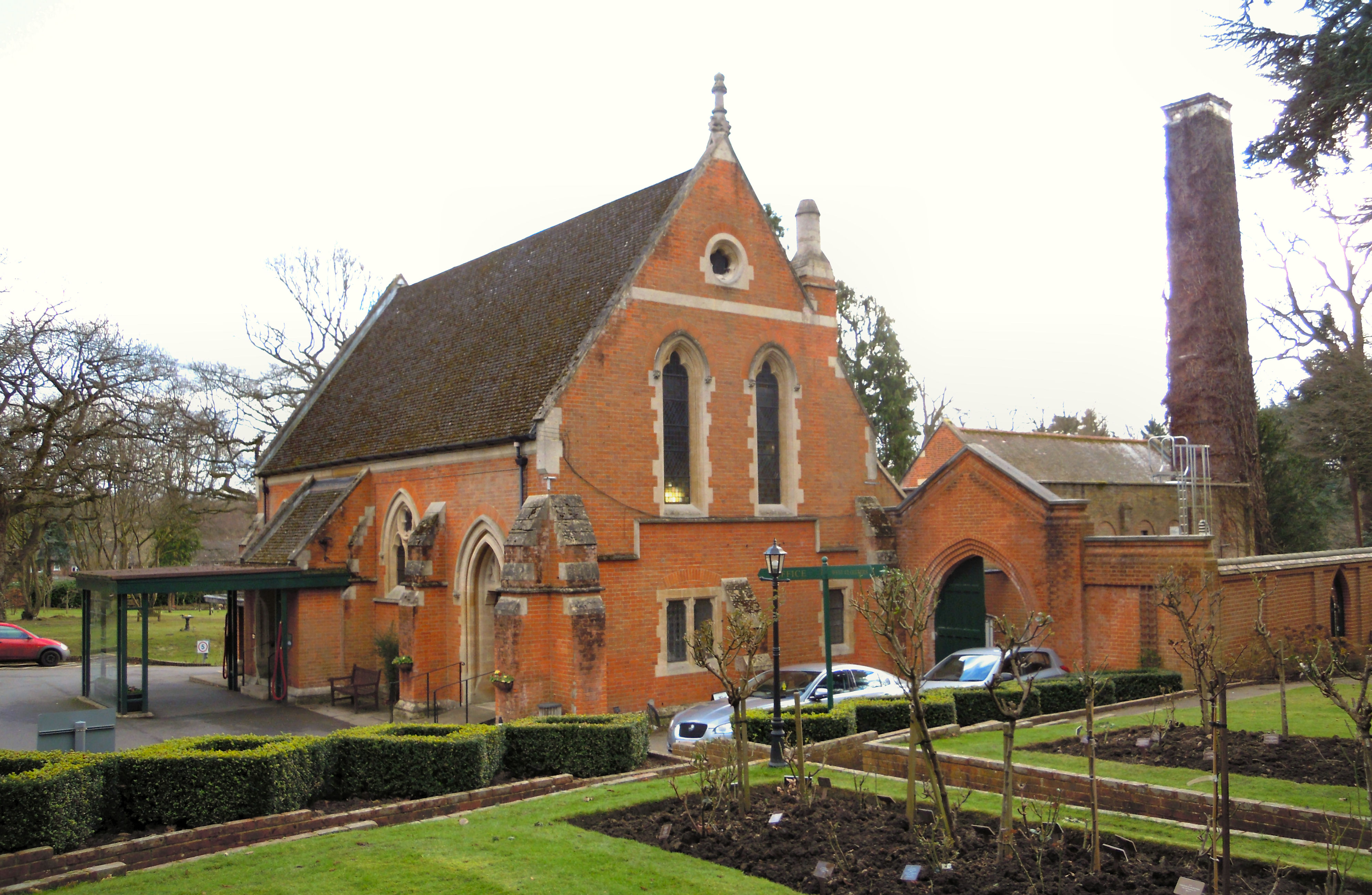
Woking Crematorium in 2018

In the winter of 1892, Britain was afflicted by an influenza epidemic (the global 1889–1890 flu pandemic), and Blavatsky contracted the virus. It caused her death on the afternoon of 8 May 1891, in Besant's house. The date would come to be commemorated by Theosophists ever since as White Lotus Day. Her body was cremated at Woking Crematorium on 11 May.

In Dnipro, a street named after communist politician Volodymyr Shcherbytsky was renamed "Olena Blavatsky Street" in 2015 as a result of decommunization laws.

== Personal life ==
Blavatsky talked incessantly in a guttural voice, sometimes wittily and sometimes crudely. She was indifferent to sex yet frank and open about it; fonder of animals than of people; welcoming, unpretentious, scandalous, capricious and rather noisy. She was also humorous, vulgar, impulsive and warm-hearted, and didn't give a hoot for anyone or anything.

— Biographer Peter Washington, 1993.

The biographer Peter Washington described Blavatsky as "a short, stout, forceful woman, with strong arms, several chins, unruly hair, a determined mouth, and large, liquid, slightly bulging eyes". She had distinctive azure-colored eyes, and was overweight throughout her life. According to the biographer Marion Meade, Blavatsky's "general appearance was outrageously untidy". In later life, she was known for wearing loose robes, and wore many rings on her fingers. She was a heavy cigarette smoker throughout her life, and at times smoked hashish. She lived simply, and her followers believed that she refused to accept monetary payment in return for disseminating her teachings. Blavatsky preferred to be known by the initialism "HPB", a sobriquet applied to her by many of her friends which was first developed by Olcott. She avoided social functions and was scornful of social obligations. She spoke Russian, Georgian, English, French, Italian, Arabic, and Sanskrit.

Meade referred to her as "an eccentric who abided by no rules except her own", someone who had "utter disregard for the Victorian code of morality". Meade believed that Blavatsky perceived herself as a messianic figure whose purpose was to save the world by promoting Theosophy. Lachman stated that Blavatsky exhibited what he referred to as "Russian traits – an intense devotion to spiritual truth, combined with a profound contradictory character." Washington called her "a persuasive story-teller [with the] power to fascinate others," who was also "self-absorbed and egotistical". For Meade, Blavatsky had a "vivid imagination" and a "propensity for lying". Godwin wrote that Blavatsky had "a fearsome temper". The religious studies scholar Bruce F. Campbell noted that she had been a "strong-willed, independent child", and that the harsh environment of her childhood might have resulted in her "difficulty in controlling her temper and ... her tendency to swear". In his opinion, she represented "an archetypal charismatic leader". Anthropologist Leo Klejn called Blavatsky's indefatigability and energy surprising. The Indologist Alexander Senkevich observed that Blavatsky's charisma influenced Charles Massey and Stainton Moses.

Blavatsky's sexuality has been an issue of dispute; many biographers believed that she remained celibate throughout her life, with Washington believing that she "hated sex with her own sort of passion". In later life she stated that she was a virgin, although she had been married to two men during her lifetime. Throughout its early years, the Theosophical Society promoted celibacy, even within marriage. Some suggest she may have been a lesbian or transvestite, due to early accounts that she traveled dressed in masculine attire. Meade thought that Blavatsky had, with a few exceptions, been "contemptuous" of other women, suggesting that while this may have been the result of general societal misogyny, it could also mean Blavatsky had been jilted by a woman.

=== Socio-political beliefs ===
Godwin suggested that Blavatsky's life work was "not only spiritual but socially idealistic and fiercely political". He suggested that her "emotional fuel" was partly "a hatred of oppression", which Godwin said was by the domination of either Christianity or British colonial rule in India. Conversely, Meade thought Blavatsky to be "basically a non-political person".

Blavatsky's social and political beliefs, like much else in her life, are not always consistent, but also reflect her larger vision. More than anything else, that was the vision of the succession of root races. These races were a flexible category, cultural as well as physiological, with races often combining in the course of history. Moreover, inspired by recent acrimonious debates over evolution, they are also dynamic, emergent forces. Gary Lachman wrote, "Although few historians have noted it, in Isis Unveiled (1877), Blavatsky presented the first major intellectual – not religious – criticism of evolution." Blavatsky held that Darwinism explained human physical evolution, while spirituality followed another developmental pattern.

The scholar of religion Olav Hammer noted that "on rare occasions" Blavatsky's writings are "overtly racist", adding that her antisemitism "derives from the unfortunate position of Judaism as the origin of Christianity" and refers to "the intense dislike she felt for Christianity".

== Theories and doctrines ==
According to Meade, Blavatsky assembled her theories and doctrines gradually, in a piecemeal fashion. Blavatsky claimed that these Theosophical doctrines were not her own invention, but had been received from a brotherhood of secretive spiritual adepts whom she referred to as the "Masters" or "Mahatmas".

=== Theosophy, the Masters, and the "Ancient Wisdom" ===
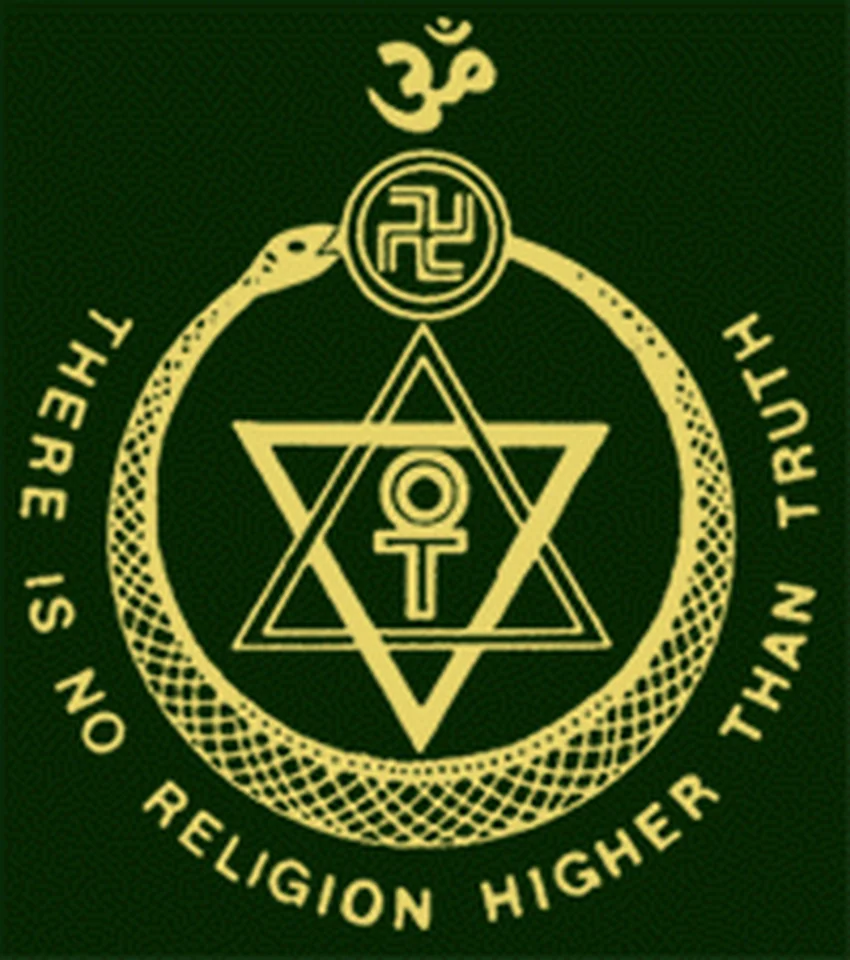
The logo for the Theosophical Society brought together various ancient symbols

Blavatsky was the leading theoretician of the Theosophical Society, responsible for establishing its "doctrinal basis". The ideas expounded in her published texts provide the basis from which the Society and wider Theosophical movement emerged. Blavatsky's Theosophical ideas were a form of occultism. She subscribed to the anti-Christian current of thought within Western esotericism which emphasized the idea of an ancient and universal "occult science" that should be revived. Blavatsky stated that the Theosophical teachings were passed on to her by adepts, who lived in various parts of the world.

Fundamentally, the underlying concept behind Blavatsky's Theosophy was that there was an "ancient wisdom religion" which had once been found across the world, and which was known to various ancient figures, such as the Greek philosopher Plato and the ancient Hindu sages. Blavatsky connected this ancient wisdom religion to Hermetic philosophy, a worldview in which everything in the universe is identified as an emanation from the Godhead. Blavatsky believed that all of the world's religions developed from this original global faith. Blavatsky understood her Theosophy to be the heir to the Neoplatonist philosophers of Late Antiquity, who had also embraced Hermetic philosophy. Blavatsky claimed that due to Christianization in Europe, this magical tradition was lost there, while it persisted in modified form in India and Africa. She promoted a self-consciously magical disenchantment narrative. Blavatsky believed that the Theosophical movement's revival of the "ancient wisdom religion" would spread across the world, eclipsing the established world religions. Thus, in bringing these Theosophical ideas to humanity, Blavatsky viewed herself as a messianic figure.

According to Goodrick-Clarke, the Theosophical Society "disseminated an elaborate philosophical edifice involving a cosmogony, the macrocosm of the universe, spiritual hierarchies, and intermediary beings, the latter having correspondences with a hierarchical conception of the microcosm of man." Officially, the Society based itself upon the following three objectives:

1. To form a nucleus of the Universal Brotherhood of Humanity, without distinction of race, creed, sex, caste, or color.
2. To encourage the study of Comparative Religion, Philosophy, and Science.
3. To investigate the unexplained laws of Nature and the powers latent in man.

Washington believed that the purpose of these three precepts was to lead to the "discovery of the powers latent in man through the occult study of science, philosophy and religion [which] shall be the preferred route to the social harmony and equality which will prefigure – and perhaps become – the divine harmony."

While living in New York City, Blavatsky had referred to herself as a "Buddhist", although officially embraced Buddhism only while in Ceylon. However, Lachman stated that her Buddhism was "highly eccentric and had little to do with the Buddhism of scholars like [Max] Müller or that of your average Buddhist". Blavatsky argued that The Buddha had sought to return to the teachings of the Vedas, and that Buddhism was therefore a more accurate descendant of ancient Brahmanism than modern Hinduism. Although critical of Catholicism and Protestantism, and opposing their growth in Asia, throughout her life she remained highly sympathetic to the Russian Orthodox Church, commenting that "with the faith of the Russian Church I will not even compare Buddhism".

G. R. S. Mead proclaimed, "Two things in all the chaos of her [Blavatsky's] cosmos stood firm in every mood – that her Teachers existed, and that she had not cheated."

=== Theology, cosmogony, and the place of humanity ===
Blavatsky's writings garnered the materials of Neoplatonism, Renaissance magic, Kabbalah, and Freemasonry, together with ancient Egyptian and Greco-Roman mythology and religion, joined by Eastern doctrines taken from Buddhism and Advaita Vedanta, to present the idea of an ancient wisdom handed down from prehistoric times.

— Historian Nicholas Goodrick-Clarke, 2008.

Blavatsky expounded what has been described as a "monotheistic, immanentist, and mystical cosmology". Blavatsky was a pantheist, and emphasized the idea of an impersonal divinity, referring to the Theosophical God as a "universal Divine Principle, the root of All, from which all proceeds, and within which all shall be absorbed at the end of the great cycle of being". She was dismissive of the Christian idea of God in the Western world, describing it as "a bundle of contradictions and a logical impossibility." She said the universe emanated from this Divine Principle, with each particle of matter being infused with a spark of the divine. Lower Orders emanated from higher ones, before becoming increasingly dense and being absorbed back into the Divine Principle. This cosmology exhibited commonalities with the scientific discoveries of geology and biological evolution, both of which had been revealed by scientific inquiry during the 19th century.

In The Secret Doctrine, Blavatsky articulated the belief that in the beginning of time there was absolute nothingness. This primordial essence then separated itself into seven Rays, which were also intelligent beings known as the Dhyan Chohans; these Seven Rays then created the universe using an energy called Fohat. The Earth was created and underwent seven Rounds, in each of which different living beings were created.

Blavatsky advocated the idea of "Root Races", each of which was divided into seven Sub-Races. In Blavatsky's cosmogony, the first Root Race were created from pure spirit and lived on a continent known as the "Imperishable Sacred Land". The second Root Race, known as the Hyperboreans, were also formed from pure spirit and lived on a land near to the North Pole, which then had a mild climate. The third lived on the continent of Lemuria, which Blavatsky alleged survives today as Australia and Rapa Nui. Blavatsky alleged that during the fourth Round of the Earth, higher beings descended to the planet, with the beginnings of human physical bodies developing and the sexes separating. At this point, the fourth Root Race appeared, living on the continent of Atlantis. They had physical bodies but also psychic powers and advanced technology. She claimed that some Atlanteans were giants and built such ancient monuments as Stonehenge in southern England, and that they mated with "she-animals", resulting in the creation of gorillas and chimpanzees. The Atlanteans were decadent and abused their power and knowledge, so Atlantis sunk into the sea, although various Atlanteans escaped and created new societies in Egypt and the Americas.

The fifth Root Race to emerge was the Aryans and was found across the world at the time she was writing. She believed that the fifth Race would come to be replaced by the sixth, which would be heralded by the arrival of Maitreya, a figure from Mahayana Buddhist mythology. She further believed that humanity would eventually develop into the final, seventh Root Race. Lachman suggested that by reading Blavatsky's cosmogonical claims as a literal account of history, "we may be doing it a disservice." He suggested that it could instead be read as Blavatsky's attempt to formulate "a new myth for the modern age, or as a huge, fantastic science fiction story".

Blavatsky taught that humans composed of three separate parts: a divine spark, an astral fluid body, and the physical body. Later Blavatsky proclaimed the septenary of Man and Universe. According to Blavatsky, man is composed of seven parts: Atma, Buddhi, Manas, Kama rupa, Linga sharira, Prana, and Sthula sharira. In Isis Unveiled, Blavatsky denied that humans would be reincarnated back on the Earth after physical death. However, by the time that she had authored The Secret Doctrine, she had changed her opinion on this issue, likely influenced by her time in India. Here, she stated that the law of reincarnation was governed by karma, with humanity's final purpose being the emancipation of the soul from the cycle of death and rebirth. She believed that knowledge of karma would ensure that human beings lived according to moral principles, arguing that it provided a far greater basis for moral action than that of the Christian doctrine. Blavatsky wrote, in Isis Unveiled, that Spiritualism "alone offers a possible last refuge of compromise between" the "revealed religions and materialistic philosophies". While she acknowledged that fanatic believers "remained blind to its imperfections", she wrote that such a fact was "no excuse to doubt its reality" and asserted that Spiritualist fanaticism was "itself a proof of the genuineness and possibility of their phenomena".

Goodrick-Clarke noted that Blavatsky's cosmology contained all four of the prime characteristics of Western esotericism that had been identified by the scholar Antoine Faivre: "(a) correspondences between all parts of the universe, the macrocosm and microcosm; (b) living nature as a complex, plural, hierarchical, and animate whole; (c) imagination and mediations in the form of intermediary spirits, symbols, and mandalas; and (d) the experience of transmutation of the soul through purification and ascent."

At the Theosophical Society in America's 2019 Summer National Convention, author Mitch Horowitz noted, in a lecture titled "The Secret Doctrine and America," that "Each of us has a unique responsibility, if we really wish to participate as beings possessed of full perception and engagement in this cosmogenesis that [Blavatsky] is talking about, [...] to cultivate awareness of what's going on in our world, both on a cosmic scale and individually and internally."

== Controversy ==
[Blavatsky was] one of the most significant, controversial, and prolific of modern esotericists ... It is more than evident that, whatever one thinks of the more flamboyant aspects of this remarkable and many-sided woman, she possessed a keen intellect and a wide-ranging vision of what occultism could be in the modern world.

— Robert Ellwood, 2005, Religious studies scholar and Vice-President of the Theosophical Society in America (2002-2005).

Various authors, including William Emmette Coleman and others, have questioned the authenticity of her writings by citing evidence that they are heavily plagiarized from older esoteric sources, pronouncing her claim of the existence of masters of wisdom to be utterly false, and accusing her of being a charlatan, false medium, and falsifier of letters. Eastern literature scholar Arthur Lillie published a list of extracts from mystic works next to extracts from Blavatsky's writings purporting to show her extensive plagiarism in his book Madame Blavatsky and her Theosophy. Lillie also analyzed the Mahatma letters and asserted, based on peculiarities of expression and spelling, that they had been written by Blavatsky.

The Traditionalist School writer René Guénon wrote a detailed critique of Theosophy in which he claimed that Blavatsky had acquired all her knowledge naturally from other books rather than supernatural so-called "masters". Carl Jung virulently criticized her work, and Agehananda Bharati dismissed it as "a melee of horrendous hogwash and of fertile inventions of inane esoterica". Mircea Eliade suggested that her theory of spiritual evolution contradicts the entire spirit of Eastern tradition, which is "precisely an anti-evolutionist conception of the spiritual life". After her death, Blavatsky continued to be accused of having fraudulently produced paranormal phenomena by skeptics such as John Nevil Maskelyne, Robert Todd Carroll, and James Randi.

Peter Washington notes that Blavatsky's beliefs clashed with both Christianity and science, Darwinism in particular. Furthermore, Washington claims that Blavatsky's supporters argued against any criticisms of her as slander by Christians and Darwinians, conceiving her as a martyr.

== Influence ==
According to religious studies scholar Mark Bevir, Blavatsky "adapted the occult tradition to meet the challenge of Victorian science and morality". Historian Ronald Hutton described Blavatsky as "one of the century's truly international figures" whose ideas gained "considerable popularity". Various biographers have noted that, by the late 20th and early 21st centuries, Blavatsky was little-known among the general public. In 2006, scholar James A. Santucci nevertheless noted that she was "as visible today as any modern trend-setting guru, and she will most likely remain the most memorable and innovative esotericist of the 19th century."

Some scholars have suggested that Blavatsky sometimes spoke and/or wrote while in altered states of consciousness. G. R. S. Mead wrote about Blavatsky, "I know no one who detested, more than she did, any attempt to hero-worship herself – she positively physically shuddered at any expression of reverence to herself – as a spiritual teacher; I have heard her cry out in genuine alarm at an attempt to kneel to her made by an enthusiastic admirer." Leo Klejn wrote about Blavatsky: "Indefatigability and energy of this woman were surprising. She had a revolutionary's merits." (Note: Theosophist Leadbeater claimed that, at the time of the French Revolution, Blavatsky was "in incarnation under the name of Père Joseph" and worked with "the Comte de S. Germain".Leadbeater, Charles Webster (1992), The Hidden Life in Freemasonry, Whitefish, MT: Kessinger Publishing, ISBN 978-1-56459-026-8) Mabel Collins, an associate and publisher of Lucifer between 1887 and 1889, believed Blavatsky's influence to be derived largely from a talent for manipulation. After leaving the Theosophical movement, Collins said that "she taught me one great lesson. I learned from her how foolish, how 'gullible', how easily flattered human beings are, taken en masse. Her contempt for her kind was on the same gigantic scale as everything else about her, except her marvellously delicate taper fingers. In all else, she was a big woman. She had a greater power over the weak and credulous, a greater capacity for making black appear white, a larger waist, a more voracious appetite, a more confirmed passion for tobacco, a more ceaseless and insatiable hatred for those whom she thought to be her enemies, a greater disrespect for les convenances, a worse temper, a greater command of bad language, and a greater contempt for the intelligence of her fellow-beings than I had ever supposed possible to be contained in one person. These, I suppose, must be reckoned as her vices, though whether a creature so indifferent to all ordinary standards of right and wrong can be held to have virtues or vices, I know not."

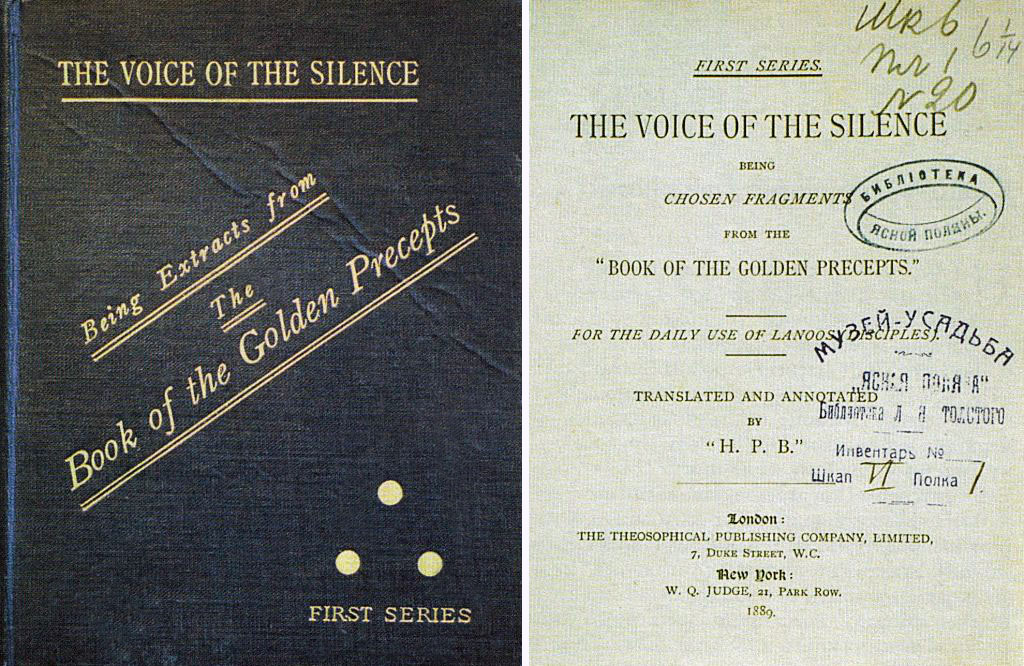
The book The Voice of the Silence presented by Blavatsky to Leo Tolstoy

Blavatsky presented her book, The Voice of the Silence, to Leo Tolstoy. In his works, Tolstoy used the dicta from Theosophischer Wegweiser, a Theosophical journal. In his 12 February 1903, diary entry, Tolstoy wrote: "I am reading a beautiful theosophical journal and find many commonalities with my understanding."

=== Theosophical movement ===
According to Kalnitsky, the Theosophical movement of the nineteenth century was created and defined in the main through the astuteness and conceptual ideas provided by H.P. Blavatsky. He stated that "without her charismatic leadership and uncompromising promotion of the Theosophical agenda, it appears unlikely that the movement could have attained its unique form." By the time of her death in 1891 she was the acknowledged head of a community numbering nearly 100,000, with journalistic organs in London, Paris, New York and Madras. Her writings have been translated and published in a wide range of European and Asian languages.

Blavatsky's Theosophy redirected the interest in Spiritualism toward a more coherent doctrine that included cosmology with theory of evolution in an understanding of humanity's spiritual development. Further, it took the traditional sources of Western esotericism and globalized them by restating many of their ideas in terminology adopted from Asian religions. Blavatsky's Theosophy was able to appeal to women by de-emphasizing the importance of gender and allowing them to take on spiritual leadership equal to that of men, thus allowing them a greater role than that permitted in traditional Christianity.

Since its inception, and through doctrinal assimilation or divergence, Theosophy has also given rise to or influenced the development of other mystical, philosophical, and religious movements. During the 1920s the Theosophical Society Adyar had around 7,000 members in the U.S. There also was a substantial following in Asia. According to a Theosophical source, the Indian section in 2008 was said to have around 13,000 members while in the US the 2008 membership was reported at around 3,900.

=== Western esotericism ===
Blavatsky's Theosophy has been described as representing "a major factor in the modern revival" of Western esotericism. Godwin deemed there to be "no more important figure in modern times" within the Western esoteric tradition than Blavatsky. For Johnson, Blavatsky was "a central figure in the nineteenth-century occult revival". Lachman claimed that "practically all modern occultism and esotericism" can trace its origins back to her influence. Blavatsky's published Theosophical ideas, particularly those regarding Root Races, have been cited as an influence on Ariosophy, the esoteric movement established in late 19th- and early 20th-century Germany and Austria by Guido von List and Jörg Lanz von Liebenfels. Hannah Newman stated that via Ariosophy, Blavatsky's Theosophical ideas "contributed to Nazi ideology". Nevertheless, Lachman has asserted that Blavatsky should not be held accountable to any of the antisemitic and racist ideas that the Ariosophists promoted, commenting that were she alive to witness the development of Ariosophy, she probably would have denounced its ideas regarding race. Blavatsky's Theosophical ideas regarding Root Races have also been cited as an influence on Anthroposophy, the esoteric movement developed by Rudolf Steiner in early 20th-century Germany, with Steiner's Anthroposophical Society being termed a "historical offshoot" of the Theosophical Society.

Blavatsky's Theosophy has been cited as an influence on the New Age movement, an esoteric current that emerged in Western nations during the 1970s. "No single organization or movement has contributed so many components to the New Age Movement as the Theosophical Society. ... It has been the major force in the dissemination of occult literature in the West in the twentieth century." (Note: The "Chronology of the New Age Movement" in New Age Encyclopedia begins with the formation of the Theosophical Society in 1875. See Lewis & Melton 1994, xi.) Other organizations loosely based on Theosophical texts and doctrines include the Agni Yoga, and a group of religions based on Theosophy called the Ascended Master Teachings: the "I AM" Activity, The Bridge to Freedom, Universal Medicine and The Summit Lighthouse, which evolved into the Church Universal and Triumphant.

=== Linguistics ===
American scholar of religion Jason Josephson-Storm has argued that Blavatsky and her Theosophical Society influenced late nineteenth- and early twentieth-century academic linguistics. Josephson-Storm notes that Blavatsky's linguistic theories and typologies were widely circulated in Europe, and that influential linguists such as Émile-Louis Burnouf and Benjamin Lee Whorf either practiced Theosophy as promoted by the Theosophical Society or publicly defended its doctrines. Ferdinand de Saussure is also known to have attended séances and wrote a lengthy analysis of the Theosophical claims about linguistics and India, "la théosophie brahmanique (Brahamanic Theosophy)" while delivering his Cours de linguistique générale.

=== South Asian religion and politics ===
Hutton suggested that Blavatsky had a greater impact in Asia than in the Western world. Blavatsky has been cited as having inspired Hindus to respect their own religious roots. The Theosophical Society influenced the growth of Indian national consciousness, with prominent figures in the Indian independence movement, among them Mohandas Gandhi and Jawaharlal Nehru, being inspired by Theosophy to study their own national heritage. The Theosophical Society had a major influence on Buddhist modernism and Hindu reform movements, while Blavatsky and Olcott took part in Anagarika Dharmapala's revival of Theravada Buddhism in Ceylon.

Meade stated that "more than any other single individual", Blavatsky was responsible for bringing a knowledge of Eastern religion and philosophy to the West. Blavatsky believed that Indian religion offered answers to problems then facing Westerners; in particular, she believed that Indian religion contained an evolutionary cosmology which complemented Darwinian evolutionary theory, and that the Indian doctrine of reincarnation met many of the moral qualms surrounding vicarious atonement and eternal damnation that preoccupied 19th-century Westerners. In doing so, Meade believed that Blavatsky paved the way for the emergence of later movements such as the International Society for Krishna Consciousness, Transcendental Meditation movement, Zen Buddhism, and yoga in the West. Hutton believed that the two greatest achievements of Blavatsky's movement were in popularizing belief in reincarnation and in a singular divine world soul within the West.

Blavatsky "both incorporated a number of the doctrines of eastern religions into her occultism, and interpreted eastern religions in the light of her occultism", in doing so extending a view of the "mystical East" that had already been popularized through Romanticist poetry. Max Müller scathingly criticized Blavatsky's Esoteric Buddhism. Whilst he was willing to give her credit for good motives, at least at the beginning of her career, in his view she ceased to be truthful both to herself and to others with her later "hysterical writings and performances". There is nothing esoteric or secretive in Buddhism, he wrote, in fact the very opposite. "Whatever was esoteric was ipso facto not Buddha's teaching; whatever was Buddha's teaching was ipso facto not esoteric". (Note: For Sinnett's response and Müller's rejoinder, see Sinnett 1893 and Müller 1893b.) Blavatsky, it seemed to Müller, "was either deceived by others or carried away by her own imaginations." Blavatsky responded to those academic specialists in Indian religion who accused her of misrepresenting it by claiming that they understood only the exoteric nature of Hinduism and Buddhism and not the inner esoteric secrets of these faiths, which she traced back to the ancient Vedas.

== Books ==
- Isis Unveiled: A Master-Key to the Mysteries of Ancient and Modern Science and Theology (1877)
- Studies in Occultism: A collection of articles from Lucifer (1887–1891)
- From the Caves and Jungles of Hindostan (1879–1886)
- The Secret Doctrine: The Synthesis of Science, Religion and Philosophy (1888)
- The Voice of the Silence (1889)
- The Key to Theosophy (1889)
- Nightmare Tales (1907)

== See also ==
- Charles Webster Leadbeater
- Annie Besant
- Alice Bailey
- Benjamin Creme
- Helena Roerich
- Edward Bulwer-Lytton
- Ivan Benigar (or Juan Benigar)
- Schola Philosophicae Initiationis
- Alexander Scriabin
- Rudolf Steiner
- Martinus
- Theosophical mysticism
- Buddhism and Theosophy
- Christianity and Theosophy
- Hinduism and Theosophy
- Theosophy and literature
- Theosophy and visual arts
- Theosophy and Western philosophy
- Tulpa
- Violet Tweedale, close associate of Blavatsky
- "What Is Theosophy?" – article by Blavatsky
