= The Secret Doctrine =

1888 pseudoscientific book by Helena Blavatsky

The Secret Doctrine, the Synthesis of Science, Religion and Philosophy
- The three volumes of the third, revised edition of The Secret Doctrine (Volumes I–II, 1893; Volume III, 1897), together with the index to Volumes I and II (1895)
- Author: Helena Blavatsky
- Published: 1888

The Secret Doctrine, the Synthesis of Science, Religion and Philosophy (1st edition, 2 vols., 1888) is a pseudoscientific esoteric work written by Helena Blavatsky, founder of the religious movement known as Theosophy. Volume 1 is subtitled Cosmogenesis, and Volume 2 is subtitled Anthropogenesis.

The Secret Doctrine is an influential example of the revival of interest in esoteric and occult ideas in the modern age, in particular because of its claim to reconcile ancient eastern wisdom with modern science. Proponents widely claim the literature contains clues as to how the nature of prayer was 'covered' and expunged from common wisdom, except for those with a keen eye. It has been criticized for promoting pseudoscientific concepts and for borrowing without credit those from other systems.

== Volume one (Cosmogenesis) ==
In Volume One, Blavatsky details her interpretation of the origin and evolution of the universe itself, in terms derived from the Hindu concept of cyclical development. The world and everything in it is said to alternate between periods of activity (manvantaras) and periods of passivity (pralayas). Each manvantara lasts many millions of years and consists of a number of Yugas, in accordance with Hindu cosmology.

Blavatsky attempted to demonstrate that the discoveries of "materialist" science had been anticipated in the writings of ancient sages and that materialism would be proven wrong.

=== Cosmic evolution: Items of cosmogony ===
In this recapitulation of The Secret Doctrine, Blavatsky gave a summary of the central points of her system of cosmogony. These central points are as follows:

1. The first item reiterates Blavatsky's position that The Secret Doctrine represents the "accumulated Wisdom of the Ages", a system of thought that "is the uninterrupted record covering thousands of generations of Seers whose respective experiences were made to test and to verify the traditions passed orally by one early race to another, of the teachings of higher and exalted beings, who watched over the childhood of Humanity."
2. The second item reiterates the first fundamental proposition (see above), calling the one principle "the fundamental law in that system [of cosmogony]". Here Blavatsky says of this principle that it is "the One homogeneous divine Substance-Principle, the one radical cause. … It is called "Substance-Principle", for it becomes "substance" on the plane of the manifested Universe, an illusion, while it remains a "principle" in the beginningless and endless abstract, visible and invisible Space. It is the omnipresent Reality: impersonal, because it contains all and everything. Its impersonality is the fundamental conception of the System. It is latent in every atom in the Universe, and is the Universe itself."
3. The third item reiterates the second fundamental proposition (see above), impressing once again that "The Universe is the periodical manifestation of this unknown Absolute Essence.", while also touching upon the complex Sanskrit ideas of Parabrahmam and Mulaprakriti. This item presents the idea that the One unconditioned and absolute principle is covered over by its veil, Mulaprakriti, that the spiritual essence is forever covered by the material essence.
4. The fourth item is the common eastern idea of Maya. Blavatsky states that the entire universe is called illusion because everything in it is temporary, i.e. has a beginning and an end, and is therefore unreal in comparison to the eternal changelessness of the One Principle.
5. The fifth item reiterates the third fundamental proposition (see above), stating that everything in the universe is conscious, in its own way and on its own plane of perception. Because of this, the Occult Philosophy states that there are no unconscious or blind laws of Nature, that all is governed by consciousness and consciousnesses.
6. The sixth item gives a core idea of theosophical philosophy, that "as above, so below". This is known as the "law of correspondences", its basic premise being that everything in the universe is worked and manifested from within outwards, or from the higher to the lower, and that thus the lower, the microcosm, is the copy of the higher, the macrocosm. Just as a human being experiences every action as preceded by an internal impulse of thought, emotion or will, so too the manifested universe is preceded by impulses from divine thought, feeling and will. This item gives rise to the notion of an "almost endless series of hierarchies of sentient beings", which itself becomes a central idea of many theosophists. The law of correspondences also becomes central to the methodology of many theosophists, as they look for analogous correspondence between various aspects of reality, for instance: the correspondence between the seasons of Earth and the process of a single human life, through birth, growth, adulthood and then decline and death.

== Volume two (Anthropogenesis) ==
The second half of the book describes the origins of humanity through an account of "Root Races" said to date back millions of years. The first root race was, according to her, "ethereal"; the second root had more physical bodies and lived in Hyperborea. The third root race, the first to be truly human, is said to have existed on the lost continent of Lemuria and the fourth root race is said to have developed in Atlantis.

According to Blavatsky, the fifth root race is approximately one million years old, overlapping the fourth root race and the very first beginnings of the fifth root race were approximately in the middle of the fourth root race.

"The real line of evolution differs from the Darwinian, and the two systems are irreconcilable," according to Blavatsky, "except when the latter is divorced from the dogma of 'Natural Selection'." She explained that, "by 'Man' the divine Monad is meant, and not the thinking Entity, much less his physical body." "Occultism rejects the idea that Nature developed man from the ape, or even from an ancestor common to both, but traces, on the contrary, some of the most anthropoid species to the Third Race man." In other words, "the 'ancestor' of the present anthropoid animal, the ape, is the direct production of the yet mindless Man, who desecrated his human dignity by putting himself physically on the level of an animal."

== Volumes three and four ==
Blavatsky wanted to publish a third and fourth volume of The Secret Doctrine. After Blavatsky's death, a controversial third volume of The Secret Doctrine was prepared from Blavatsky's papers and published by Annie Besant in 1897. The fourth volume is simply an index of the first three volumes, also prepared by Annie Besant.

== Three fundamental propositions ==
Blavatsky explained the essential component ideas of her cosmogony in her magnum opus, The Secret Doctrine. She began with three fundamental propositions, of which she said:

Before the reader proceeds … it is absolutely necessary that he should be made acquainted with the few fundamental conceptions which underlie and pervade the entire system of thought to which his attention is invited. These basic ideas are few in number, and on their clear apprehension depends the understanding of all that follows…

The first proposition is that there is one underlying, unconditioned, indivisible Truth, variously called "the Absolute", "the Unknown Root", "the One Reality", etc. It is causeless and timeless, and therefore unknowable and non-describable: "It is 'Be-ness' rather than Being". (Note: "An Omnipresent, Eternal, Boundless, and Immutable PRINCIPLE on which all speculation is impossible, since it transcends the power of human conception and could only be dwarfed by any human expression or similitude.") However, transient states of matter and consciousness are manifested in IT, in an unfolding gradation from the subtlest to the densest, the final of which is physical plane. According to this view, manifest existence is a "change of condition" (Note: "The expansion 'from within without'..., does not allude to an expansion from a small centre or focus, but, without reference to size or limitation or area, means the development of limitless subjectivity into as limitless objectivity. ...It implies that this expansion, not being an increase in size—for infinite extension admits of no enlargement—was a change of condition." Manifest existence is often called "Illusion" in Theosophy, owing to its conceptual and actual differentiation from the only Reality.) and therefore neither the result of creation nor a random event.

Everything in the universe is informed by the potentialities present in the "Unknown Root", and manifest with different degrees of Life (or energy), Consciousness, and Matter. (Note: "Everything in the Universe, throughout all its kingdoms, is CONSCIOUS: i.e., endowed with a consciousness of its own kind and on its own plane of perception. We men must remember that because we do not perceive any signs—which we can recognise—of consciousness, say, in stones, we have no right to say that no consciousness exists there. There is no such thing as either 'dead' or 'blind' matter, as there is no 'Blind' or 'Unconscious' Law".)

The second proposition is "the absolute universality of that law of periodicity, of flux and reflux, ebb and flow". Accordingly, manifest existence is an eternally re-occurring event on a "boundless plane": "'the playground of numberless Universes incessantly manifesting and disappearing,'" each one "standing in the relation of an effect as regards its predecessor, and being a cause as regards its successor", doing so over vast but finite periods of time. (Note: Blavatsky states that each complete cycle lasts 311,040,000,000,000 years or 311 petaanni.)

Related to the above is the third proposition: "The fundamental identity of all Souls with the Universal Over-Soul... and the obligatory pilgrimage for every Soul—a spark of the former—through the Cycle of Incarnation (or 'Necessity') in accordance with Cyclic and Karmic law, during the whole term." The individual souls are seen as units of consciousness (Monads) that are intrinsic parts of a universal oversoul, just as different sparks are parts of a fire. These Monads undergo a process of evolution where consciousness unfolds and matter develops. This evolution is not random, but informed by intelligence and with a purpose. Evolution follows distinct paths in accord with certain immutable laws, aspects of which are perceivable on the physical level. One such law is the law of periodicity and cyclicity; another is the law of karma or cause and effect.

== Theories on human evolution and race ==
In the second volume of The Secret Doctrine, dedicated to anthropogenesis, Blavatsky presents a theory of the gradual evolution of physical humanity over a timespan of millions of years. The steps in this evolution are called rootraces, seven in all. Earlier rootraces exhibited completely different characteristics: physical bodies first appearing in the second rootrace and sexual characteristics in the third.

Some have emphasized passages and footnotes that claim some peoples to be less fully human or spiritual than the "Aryans". For example,

"Mankind is obviously divided into god-informed men and lower human creatures. The intellectual difference between the Aryan and other civilized nations and such savages as the South Sea Islanders, is inexplicable on any other grounds. No amount of culture, nor generations of training amid civilization, could raise such human specimens as the Bushmen, the Veddhas of Ceylon, and some African Tribes, to the same intellectual level as the Aryans, the Semites, and the Turanians so called. The 'sacred spark' is missing in them and it is they who are the only inferior races on the globe, now happily – owing to the wise adjustment of nature which ever works in that direction – fast dying out. Verily mankind is 'of one blood,' but not of the same essence. We are the hot-house, artificially quickened plants in nature, having in us a spark, which in them is latent" (The Secret Doctrine, Vol. 2, p 421).

When discussing "sterility between two human races" as observed by Darwin, Blavatsky notes:

"Of such semi-animal creatures, the sole remnants known to Ethnology were the Tasmanians, a portion of the Australians and a mountain tribe in China, the men and women of which are entirely covered with hair. They were the last descendants in a direct line of the semi-animal latter-day Lemurians referred to. There are, however, considerable numbers of the mixed Lemuro-Atlantean peoples produced by various crossings with such semi-human stocks – e.g., the wild men of Borneo, the Veddhas of Ceylon, classed by Prof. Flower among Aryans (!), most of the remaining Australians, Bushmen, Negritos, Andaman Islanders, etc" (The Secret Doctrine, Vol. 2, pp 195–6).

Blavatsky also asserts that "the occult doctrine admits of no such divisions as the Aryan and the Semite, accepting even the Turanian with ample reservations. Semites, especially the Arabs, are later Aryans – degenerate in spirituality and perfected in materiality" (The Secret Doctrine, Vol. 2, p 200). She also connects physical race with spiritual attributes constantly throughout her works:

"Esoteric history teaches that idols and their worship died out with the Fourth Race, until the survivors of the hybrid races of the latter (Chinamen, African negroes, &c.) gradually brought the worship back. The Vedas countenance no idols; all the modern Hindu writings do" (The Secret Doctrine, Vol. 2, p 723).

According to Blavatsky, "The MONADS of the lowest specimens of humanity (the "narrow-brained" savage South-Sea Islander, the African, the Australian) had no Karma to work out when first born as men, as their more favoured brethren in intelligence had" (The Secret Doctrine, Vol. 2, p 168).

She also prophesies of the destruction of the racial "failures of nature" as the "higher race" ascends:

"Thus will mankind, race after race, perform its appointed cycle-pilgrimage. Climates will, and have already begun, to change, each tropical year after the other dropping one sub-race, but only to beget another higher race on the ascending cycle; while a series of other less favoured groups – the failures of nature – will, like some individual men, vanish from the human family without even leaving a trace behind" (The Secret Doctrine, Vol. 2, p 446).

In The Secret Doctrine, Blavatsky states: "Verily mankind is 'of one blood,' but not of the same essence." Yet, she also said: "True, again, that if the characteristics are accepted literally". (The Secret Doctrine, Vol. 1, p. 255).

== Critical reception ==
Historian Ronald H. Fritze has written that The Secret Doctrine presents a "series of far-fetched ideas unsupported by any reliable historical or scientific research." According to Fritze:

Unfortunately the factual basis for Blavatsky's book is nonexistent. She claimed to have received her information during trances in which the Masters of Mahatmas of Tibet communicated with her and allowed her to read from the ancient Book of Dzyan. The Book of Dzyan was supposedly composed in Atlantis using the lost language of Senzar but the difficulty is that no scholar of ancient languages in the 1880s or since has encountered the slightest passing reference to the Book of Dzyan or the Senzar language.

Scholars and skeptics have criticized The Secret Doctrine for plagiarism. It is said to have been heavily influenced by occult and oriental works.

L. Sprague de Camp, in his book Lost Continents, paraphrased William Emmette Coleman's opinion that Blavatsky's main sources were "H. H. Wilson's translation of the ancient Indian Vishnu Purana; Alexander Winchell's World Life; or, Comparative Geology; Donnelly's Atlantis; and other contemporary scientific, pseudo-scientific, and occult works, plagiarized without credit and used in a blundering manner that showed but skin-deep acquaintance with the subjects under discussion." De Camp described the book as a "mass of plagiarism and fakery".

The book has also been accused of antisemitism and criticized for its emphasis on race. Historian Hannah Newman has noted that the book "denigrates the Jewish faith as harmful to human spirituality". Historian Michael Marrus has written that Blavatsky's racial ideas "could be easily misused" and that her book had helped to foster antisemitism in Germany during World War II.

== See also ==
- Book of Dzyan – Theosophical book
- Causeless cause – Postulated primary cause of all activity in the universe
- Christianity and Theosophy – Relation between Christianity and Theosophy
- Esoteric Buddhism – Book originally published in 1883
- Isis Unveiled – Key text in the Theosophical movement
- Itchasakti – Sanskrit term for willpower
- The Mahatma Letters to A.P. Sinnett – 1923 theosophical book by A. Trevor Barker
- Man: Whence, How and Whither, a Record of Clairvoyant Investigation – Theosophical book published in 1913
- Max Beckmann's sketches to The Secret Doctrine
- New Age – Range of new religious beliefs and practices
- New Thought – 19th-century American spiritual movement
- The Rosicrucian Cosmo-Conception – 1909 Rosicrucian text by Max Heindel
- Theosophy – Religion established in the United States

== Bibliography ==
- Blavatsky, HP (1888a), The Secret Doctrine.
- Blavatsky, HP (1888b), The First Message to WQ Judge, General Secretary of the American Section of the Theosophical Society.
- Blavatsky, HP, The Key to Theosophy.
- Bowen, PGB (15 November 2010), The Secret Doctrine and Its Study, Pasadena: The Society.
- Heindel, Max (1933), Blavatsky and The Secret Doctrine (essay), Rosicrucian zine, introduction by Manly Palmer Hall.
- Keightley, Archibald Account of the Writing of "The Secret Doctrine".
- Kuhn, Alvin Boyd (1930) Theosophy: A Modern Revival of Ancient Wisdom, PhD Thesis. Whitefish, Montana: Kessinger Publishing. Chap. viii "The Secret Doctrine", pp. 193–230. ISBN 9781564591753.
- Sedgwick, Mark (2004). Against the Modern World: Traditionalism and the Secret Intellectual History of the Twentieth Century. Oxford University Press. ISBN 978-0195152975.
- Wachtmeister, Constance Reminiscences of H.P. Blavatsky and "The Secret Doctrine".
- Сенкевич, Александр Николаевич (2012) Елена Блаватская. Между светом и тьмой – М.: Алгоритм. Гл. "Тайная доктрина", стр. 455–462. ISBN 9785443802374.
