= Ronald H. Fritze =

American historian (born 1951)

Ronald H. Fritze (born 1951) is an American encyclopedist, historian, and writer known for his criticism of pseudohistoric ideas.

== Biography ==
Fritze earned his BA in history at Concordia College in 1974. He obtained a master's degree from Louisiana State University and a PhD from Cambridge University in 1981. He has worked at Lamar University in Beaumont and the University of Central Arkansas in 2001 as chair of the history department. He is currently Dean of the College of Arts and Sciences at Athens State University.

Fritze is the author of Invented Knowledge: False History, Fake Science, and Pseudo-religions (2009) a book which critically examines the pseudohistoric claims of Martin Bernal's Black Athena, Erich von Däniken, Immanuel Velikovsky, Atlantis, Christian Identity, Nation of Islam, and fringe related pre-Columbian trans-oceanic contact theories. According to Fritze pseudohistory is a "charlatan's playground" targeting those too "willing to suspend disbelief" and slip into an "abyss of fantasy". Fritze considers such pseudohistoric ideas to be irrational and misleading the public. The book has received positive reviews.

== Publications ==
- Faith and Faction: Religious Changes, National Politics, and the Development of Local Factionalism in Hampshire, 1485–1570 (1981)
- Reflections on Western Civilization: A Reader [with Randy Roberts, James Olson] (1990)
- Historical Dictionary of Tudor England, 1485–1603 (1991)
- Legend and Lore of the Americas Before 1492: An Encyclopedia of Visitors, Explorers, and Immigrants (1993) online
- Historical Dictionary of Stuart England, 1603–1689 [with William B. Robison] (1996)
- Travel Legend and Lore: An Encyclopedia (1998)
- New Worlds: The Great Voyages of Discovery, 1400–1600 (2002)
- Fritze, Ronald H.; Robison, William B. (2002). Historical dictionary of late medieval England, 1272–1485. Archived from the original on September 27, 2014 – via Questia.
- Reference Sources in History: An Introductory Guide [with Brian Coutts, Louis Vyhnanek] (2004)
- Invented Knowledge: False History, Fake Science and Pseudo-religions (2009)
- Egyptomania: A History of Fascination, Obsession and Fantasy (2016)
- Hope and Fear: Modern Myths, Conspiracy Theories, and Pseudo-History (2022)

== See also ==
- Ancient astronauts
- Kenneth Feder
