= Theosophy and Western philosophy =

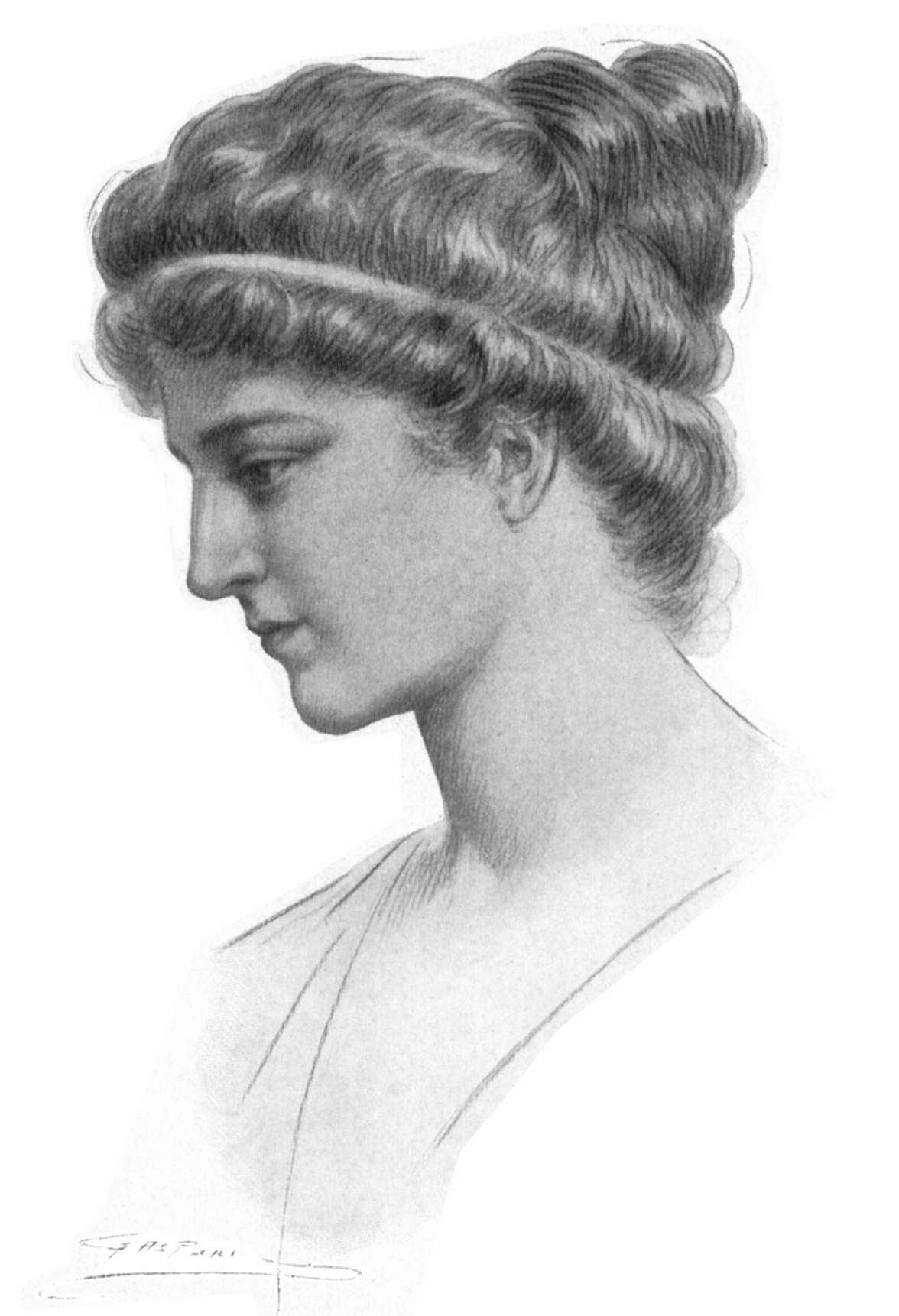
Hypatia (philosopher).

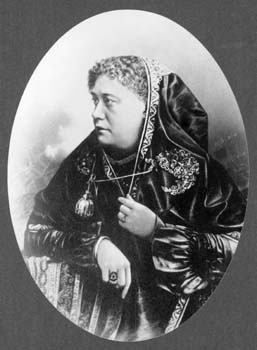
Helena Blavatsky (Theosophist).

Modern Theosophy is classified by prominent representatives of Western philosophy as a "pantheistic philosophical-religious system." Russian philosopher Vladimir Trefilov claimed that Blavatsky's doctrine was formed from the beginning as a synthesis of philosophical views and religious forms of the various ages and peoples with modern scientific ideas. Michael Wakoff, an author of The Routledge Encyclopedia of Philosophy, stated that Blavatskian Theosophy was based on Buddhist and Hindu philosophy, and fragments of the Western esotericism with using an "absolutist metaphysics." In The New Encyclopedia of Philosophy it is said that Blavatsky's Theosophy is an attempt to merge into a universal doctrine all religions by revealing their "common deep essence" and detection of "identity meanings of symbols," all philosophies (including esoteric), and all sciences (including occult). (Note: Professor James McClenon wrote that philosophy "used as one source of inspiration" by Blavatsky. In professor Julia Shabanova's opinion, philosophy as the "sphere of spiritual culture" is the closest one to Theosophy.)

== Philosophers about Theosophy ==
=== One point of view ===
French philosopher René Guénon wrote that "the theories of the Theosophical Society are so strangely similar to those of Bergson that one may wonder whether they do not both derive from a common source." (Note: He referred here a magazine author Georges Pécoul. According to Julia Shabanova, the Theosophical epistemology is based on intuitionism and principle of analogies.) He stated that the central place of the Theosophical doctrine is occupied by the "idea of evolution." He then wrote that, according to the Theosophical teaching, there are

"seven 'mother-races' succeed one another in the course of a 'world period', that is to say while the 'wave of life' sojourns on a given planet. Each 'race' includes seven 'sub-races', each of which is divided into seven 'branches'. On the other hand, the 'wave of life' successively runs through seven globes in a 'round', and this 'round' is repeated seven times in a same 'planetary chain', after which the 'wave of life' passes to another 'chain', composed likewise of seven planets which will be traversed seven times in their turn. Thus there are seven 'chains' in a 'planetary system', also called an 'enterprise of evolution'; and finally, our solar system is formed of ten 'planetary systems'... We are presently in the fifth 'race' of our 'world period', and in the fourth 'round' of the 'chain' of which the earth forms part and in which it occupies the fourth rank. This 'chain' is also the fourth of our 'planetary system'."

Concerning of the "so-called highly secret Tibetan texts" used by Blavatsky in writing her books The Secret Doctrine and The Voice of the Silence, Guénon stated that she has had a "translation of extracts from the Kandjur and Tandjur," published in 1836 by Alexander Csoma de Koros. (Note: It is needed to note Guénon was a hard opponent of the Theosophists, for example, he wrote, "The best way to fight Theosophy is, in our opinion, to display its history for what it is.")

=== Other point of view ===
Ukrainian philosopher Julia Shabanova wrote that, in modern interpretations of the Theosophical doctrine, one can come across the concept of "philosophy of Theosophy." In accordance with this logic, Theosophy should contain, in addition to philosophy, other aspects and manifestations. The specificity of Theosophy is "integrality of the theoretical & practical [approach], metaphysical & existential [points of view], transcendence & immanence, universal & particular, epistemology & ontology." The Theosophical object of knowledge, as well as philosophical one, is "universal, essential, ultimate" one. But, according to Shabanova, [Western] philosophy, striving for the essential, although it allows in its space irrationality, mysticism, or intuitionism, rationally explains the features of the world picture.

In Shabanova's opinion, the term "Theosophy" is often applied to the Theosophical teachings, which can be considered the "body of Theosophy." It is necessary, she wrote, to distinguish, first, the transcendental basis of Theosophy as its "universal core," secondly, Theosophy as a "state of consciousness," and thirdly, Theosophy as a systematically formulated teaching. If "Divine wisdom" is the absolute Truth, then "the Theosophical doctrine" reflects the facets of this Truth, represented through "enlightened consciousness" and framed in certain knowledge and representations. Thus, the Theosophical teaching is not Truth, but only a "description" of it. To be proficient in the Theosophical knowledge does not yet mean reaching the "Theosophical state of consciousness," because the accumulation of knowledge is not sufficient for the attainment of "Wisdom." She claimed that the Theosophical teaching gets meaning through the self-realization of man, which is a "way of awakening the Divine wisdom." (Note: Professor Iqbal Taimni stated, "Hindu religious teachers called Rishis were philosophers, and the great philosophers were generally Yogis.") Shabanova noted a "synthetic character" of the Theosophical teachings, which conditioned by the syncretic nature of the "transcendental nucleus" of Theosophy. For this reason, Theosophy can not be expressed in the form of an "ultimate doctrine," and its various interpretations lead to contradictions both within the Theosophical Society and in external assessments.

Blavatsky's definition of Theosophy is quoted in a book by Shabanova:

"Theosophy is... the archaic Wisdom-Religion, the esoteric doctrine once known in every ancient country having claims to civilization. This 'Wisdom' all the old writings show us as an emanation of the divine Principle; and the clear comprehension of it is typified in such names as the Indian Budha, the Babylonian Nebo, the Thoth of Memphis, the Hermes of Greece; in the appellations, also, of some goddesses—Metis, Neitha, Athena, the Gnostic Sophia, and finally the Vedas, from the word 'to know.' Under this designation, all the ancient philosophers of the East and West, the Hierophants of old Egypt, the Rishis of Aryavarta, the Theodidaktoi of Greece, included all knowledge of things occult and essentially divine." (Note: Vladimir Solovyov wrote that, according to the explanation of Blavatsky, her Theosophy "is not a religion, but it is divine knowledge or science," and the very term applies not to God, but to the gods or to any divine being, and it is not God's wisdom, but the divine wisdom, i. e. that belongs to the gods at all.)

Shabanova wrote that, according to Blavatsky, "Theosophy in its fruition is spiritual knowledge itself—the very essence of philosophical and theistic enquiry." And the genuine Theosophists should have faith in the intangible, omnipotent, omnipresent, and invisible Cause, which "is All, and Nothing; ubiquitous yet one; the Essence filling, binding, bounding, containing everything; contained in all."

In 1879, the originator of modern Theosophy first presented the statement on "a single Supreme Essence, Unknown and Unknowable" which was the "central idea of the Eclectic Theosophy." This statement was later developed by Blavatsky in the proem to The Secret Doctrine, where it is said that there is "an Omnipresent, Eternal, Boundless, and Immutable Principle on which all speculation is impossible, since it transcends the power of human conception and could only be dwarfed by any human expression or similitude." (Note: As professor Taimni said, "Wisdom can come only from true religion and philosophy.")

== Blavatsky about philosophy ==
=== "Philosophers and Philosophicules" ===
Arnold Kalnitsky, a religious studies scholar, wrote that in Blavatsky's article "Philosophers and Philosophicules" it is about "the issues of philosophy from the Theosophical perspective." (Note: This article was first published in 1889 in the Theosophical magazine Lucifer. Later it was included in the 11th volume of the Blavatsky Collected Writings.) The article's author believes that Theosophy deserves respect as a serious intellectual activity, basing on publicly voiced philosophical principles. (Note: Religious studies scholar Alvin Boyd Kuhn claimed, "Philosophy, not less than religion, bears the stamp of theosophical ideology.") According to Kalnitsky, to avoid confusion, she says Theosophy cannot be reduced to a single form of knowledge or intellectual activity, "Theosophy is certainly not a philosophy, simply because it includes every philosophy as every science and religion."

Kalnitsky wrote that the article author fully convinced that Theosophy should be "life blood" of philosophy, which is defined as "the science of things divine and human, and the causes in which they are contained." Also she believes that only Theosophy has the "keys" to these causes. Blavatsky claims that philosophy was "crystallization point" of various forms of knowledge, and he quoted in this way:

"When applied to god or gods, it became in every country theology; when to material nature, it was called physics and natural history; concerned with man, it appeared as anthropology and psychology; and when raised to the higher regions it becomes known as metaphysics. Such is philosophy—'the science of effects by their causes'—the very spirit of the doctrine of Karma, the most important teaching under various names of every religious philosophy, and a theosophical tenet that belongs to no one religion but explains them all. Philosophy is also called 'the science of things possible, inasmuch as they are possible'."

=== Theosophy and Hegelianism ===
In Kalnitsky's opinion, in hers article Blavatsky trying apparently to get a "legitimation" her Theosophical ideas, arguing that they are not at variance with the views of Hegel on the essence of philosophy:

"Hegel regards it as 'the contemplation of the self-development of the Absolute', or in other words as 'the representation of the Idea' (German: Darstellung der Idee). The whole of the Secret Doctrine—of which the work bearing that name is but an atom—is such a contemplation and record, as far as finite language and limited thought can record the processes of the Infinite." (Note: A Russian philosopher Sergius Bulgakov stated that for the Theosophical gnosticism, just like for Hegelianism, God and the world are "in principle cognizable.") (Note: According to Vladimir Solovyov, philosophy, as a revelation of the absolute in its absolute form, was adopted by Hegel not as a collection of various systems but as the gradual implementation of a true single system.)

Thus, according to Blavatsky, the Theosophical Secret Doctrine is the most complete and "mature" expression "of philosophical activity", which is carried out as "such a contemplation and record" of the Absolute. (Note: "The Absolute is the Ultimate Reality or Parabrahman of Hindu philosophy.") Kalnitsky wrote that, turning to the Hegelian theory and trying to find herein "substantial doctrinal parallels," she aims to consolidate her philosophical authority. Hegel's system, like most other idealist trends in philosophy, gave many useful concepts Theosophists, but in most cases, the Theosophical views differed with them due to a number of distinctions in basic positions. (Note: Abbott Clark wrote that Blavatskian Theosophy, "considered as a philosophy, is an objective idealism, because it postulates the Cosmos as the product of Cosmic Ideation and the imbodiment of consciousness." However, professor Robert Ellwood claimed that Theosophy "is not some form of metaphysical idealism or mentalism which says that consciousness is prior to matter." He wrote, "What is prior is not consciousness as we know it but the Unknown Root from which both consciousness and matter stem.") In terms of Theosophists, philosophical activity was considered barren without occult and mystical assumptions, and intelligent searches have been justified only if they have provided evidence of their beliefs.

Kalnitsky wrote that, defining "Theosophical speculation" as an act of true philosophy, Blavatsky states that the commonality of purposes eliminates traditional religious restrictions, "Thus it becomes evident that Theosophy cannot be a 'religion', still less 'a sect', but it is indeed the quintessence of the highest philosophy in all and every one of its aspects." In his opinion, Blavatsky's statement that Theosophy is the "synthesis" and something "big" compared to any discipline or type of knowledge is inevitably present certain amount of linguistic confusion and contradictions. She claims that her Theosophy should be regarded as "the quintessence of the highest philosophy in all and every one of its aspects" and that it "cannot be a religion." Trying to preserve the religious, philosophical and scientific tradition, she insists on prevailing over all synthetic and inclusive status of Theosophy, using a rhetorical technique, when a seems minor compared to the. Thus, Theosophy is not simply a religion, philosophy or science, but the more authoritative and reliable source that covers and synthesizes them. In this case, Theosophy seems "the quintessence of the highest philosophy." He wrote that "continual irritation" of the article author against any attempt to interpret Theosophy as a privileged religion or sect, which is for her a challenge, requiring immediate transition to protection by the proclamation that Theosophy avoids dogmatism and aims to be inclusive.

According to Kalnitsky, Blavatsky was sure that she was able to prove Theosophy can match with any definition of philosophy, and there is a general philosophical principles which the Theosophy does not contradict. She quotes William Hamilton, who said that philosophy is "a search for principles, sensible and abstract truths," as well as the use of reason "to its legitimate objects." She believes that Theosophy is completely legitimate and reliable means of achieving these goals, especially relating to the nature of "the Ego, or mental Self" and the relationship between "the ideal and the real." That is why in theory she perceive Theosophy, albeit with some limitations, as the equivalent of philosophy. Blavatsky believes that "he who studies Theosophy, studies the highest transcendental philosophy." In Kalnitsky's opinion, linking the Theosophical system with the tradition of philosophical reasoning, and assuming similar purposes, she trying to achieve for herself greater respectability and authority.

=== Versus unspiritual philosophism ===
At the end of her article Blavatsky resorts to accusatory rhetoric, trying once again to show that Theosophy often is beyond the horizon of the people who might recognize it. Kalnitsky noted, "She compares her situation to that of Socrates," claiming that if his teachings were rejected because of the charges against him, then certain knowledge, which was transmitted through Plato and other philosophers, would never have been given to us by the neoplatonists. Blavatsky, again turning her attention to a modern philosophical mood, contemptuously speaks of those who engage in unspiritual philosophizing. Speaking about the "true philosophers," she makes the following observation, and Kalnitsky quoted it:

"A sceptic can never aspire to that title. He who is capable of imagining the universe with its handmaiden Nature fortuitous, and hatched like the black hen of the fable, out of a self-created egg hanging in space, has neither the power of thinking nor the spiritual faculty of perceiving abstract truths; which power and faculty are the first requisites of a philosophical mind. We see the entire realm of modern Science honeycombed with such materialists, who yet claim to be regarded as philosophers. They either believe in naught as do the Secularists, or doubt according to the manner of the Agnostics."

Blavatsky believed that a priori assumption about the spiritual basis of reality determines the truth of any philosophy. (Note: According to Indian philosophy's teachings, the world "open to the senses is not the whole world of nature." Ellwood stated that, according to Theosophy: "Our ultimate environment is infinite Reality itself. It is also our closest environment, for it is manifested in everything, including ourselves.") Kalnitsky wrote that in the final part of her article she "exalts" the deductive reasoning of Plato, (Note: Alvin Kuhn noted, "It is significant that Madame Blavatsky's occult philosophy aims to restore to scientific method the deductive procedure.") comparing it with the inductive reasoning of modern thinkers: "None of our present Darwinians, and materialists and their admirers, our critics, could have studied philosophy otherwise than very 'superficially'. Hence while Theosophists have a legitimate right to the title of philosophers—true 'lovers of Wisdom'—their critics and slanderers are at best Philosophicules—the progeny of modern Philosophism." (Note: According to Clark, Blavatsky has humorously called the modern inductive philosophers, "philosophicules.")

== Philosophers' criticism ==
René Guénon

He called Blavatskian Theosophy a "theosophism" (French: théosophisme) and described it in his book as a "pseudo-religion." He wrote that presented by the Theosophical Society's leaders assertion about the alleged the "Eastern origin" of their doctrine was false, and its initial tendency was overtly anti-Christian. According to him, between the doctrine of the Theosophical Society, or, at least, that ones was proclaimed and Theosophy in the true sense of the word, there is absolutely no affinity:

"It is after all only a confused mixture of Neoplatonism, Gnosticism, Jewish Kabbalah, Hermeticism, and occultism, the whole of it being gathered as well as can be expressed around two or three ideas which, whether one likes it or not, are of completely modern and purely Western origin."

In his opinion, the Theosophical conceptions of evolution "are basically only an absurd caricature of the Hindu theory of cosmic cycles." He wrote that Theosophy "must be placed quite simply, along with spiritism and the different occultist schools to which it is obviously related, in the collection of bizarre productions of the contemporary mentality to which may be given the general name of 'neo-spiritualism.'"

Vladimir Solovyov, and other

A Russian philosopher Vladimir Solovyov wrote that the main theories and doctrines of the Theosophical Society "seem to us very shaky and vague." Blavatsky created, he explained, a "pseudo-Theosophical" Society, because hers teaching "is untenable and false." Thus, modern Theosophy is a doctrine not only "anti-religious" and "anti-scientific," but also "antiphilosophic."

A religious philosopher Sergius Bulgakov stated that [Blavatskian] Theosophy, trying to replace religion with itself, turns into a "vulgar pseudoscientific mythology." In Nikolai Berdyaev's opinion, "contemporary 'theosophical' movements" corrupted the beautiful word 'Theosophy' and "have made us forget" the existence of a genuine "Christian theosophy". He believed that modern Theosophy does not represent a synthesis of religion, philosophy and science, as its adherents say, but there is a "mixture" of them, in which there is no real religion, no real philosophy, no real science. Also besides he stated:

"It is difficult to find creative thinkers among the Theosophists. The median level of the Theosophical books is not very high. Theosophists fight independent thoughts and are little interested by the multiplicity of creative processes, that occur outside their circle. The seclusive closed-in circle is very characteristic for the Theosophical... setting."

A Russian philosopher Vladimir Lesevich, firmly believing philosophical ignorance of Blavatsky, tartly noted:

"What kind of audience they [the Theosophists] will snared, you can see from the witty expose the charlatanical tricks of Mme Blavatsky, who began a discuss the philosophy of Plato and talked a lot of all kinds of nonsense. Exposing all this nonsense shows full justice to the characteristics of the logical methods unscrupulous author of Isis Unveiled, who, appears, imagines itself that if she said anything a three-fold, the sentence has to be considered proven."

An employee of the Institute of philosophy Lydia Fesenkova also severely criticized the occult statements of Blavatsky, which described anthropogenesis, "From the point of view of science, such beliefs are an explicit profanity and don't have the right to exist in the serious literature."

== See also ==
- "Is Theosophy a Religion?"
- The Key to Theosophy
- Theosophy and Buddhism
- Theosophy and Christianity
- Theosophy and Hinduism
- Theosophy and literature
- "What Are The Theosophists?"
- "What Is Theosophy?"
