= Is Theosophy a Religion? =

1888 magazine article

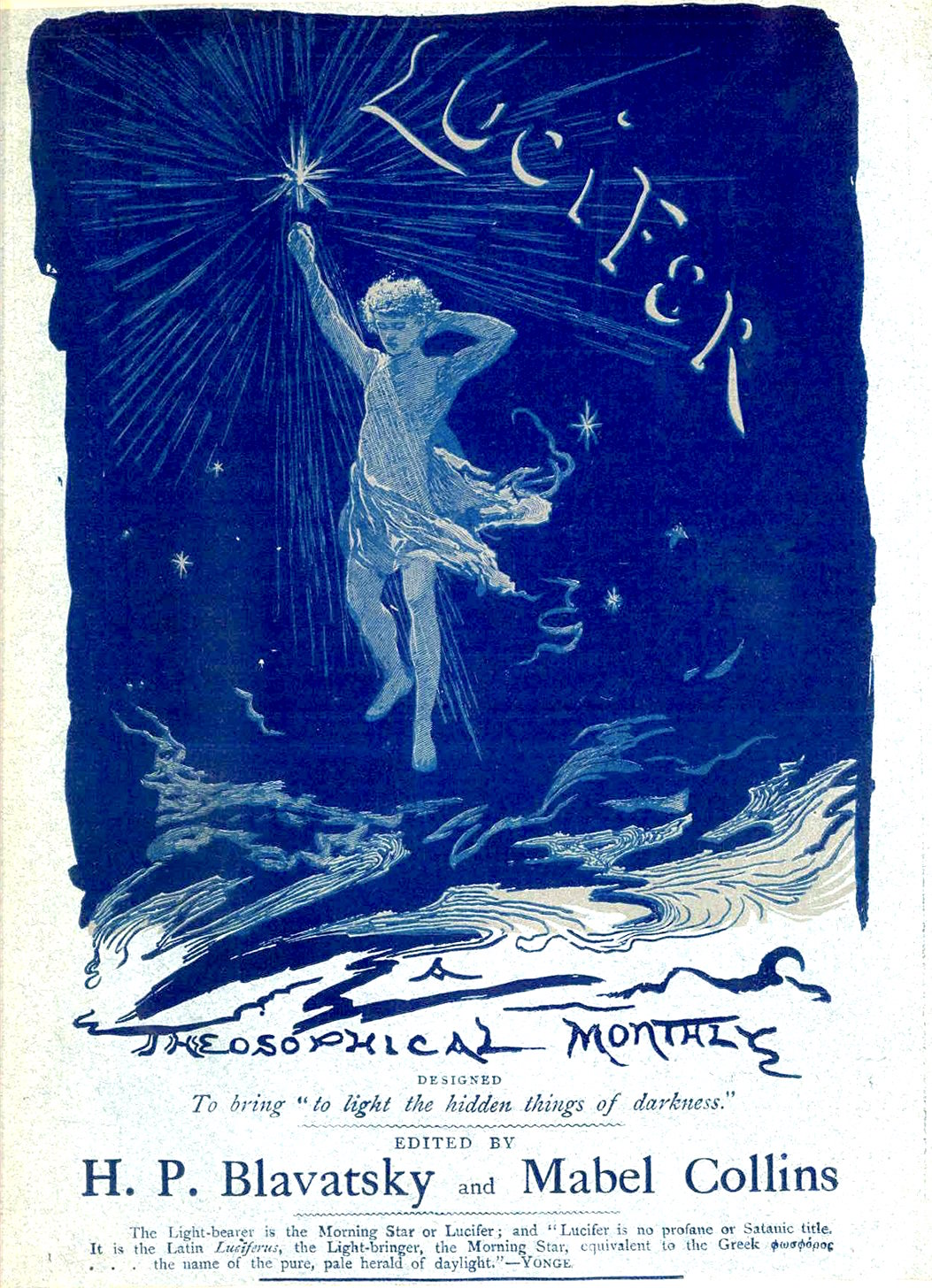
Cover of the magazine Lucifer

"Is Theosophy a Religion?" is an editorial published in November 1888 in the theosophical magazine Lucifer; it was compiled by Helena Blavatsky. (Note: Lucifer, vol. 3, No 15, November, 1888, p. 177-87.) It was included in the 10th volume of the author's Collected Writings. According to Arnold Kalnitsky, in the article it is about the problems of religion from the Theosophical point of view. The article argues that Theosophy is not a religion but is religion itself, and that it is a system for finding the underlying truth in all dogmatic creeds.

== Analysis of contents ==
=== Incorrect assumptions ===
Kalnitsky wrote in his thesis that by studying this Blavatsky's work, we can find out the relation of the Theosophists to religion. It begins with the statement (the author has reproduced it repeatedly elsewhere) that there is "a general sense of confusion" and a lack of understanding by the public about the true nature of the Theosophical movement. In particular, it is often assumed that the movement is a religion. Kalnitsky has quoted:

"Year after year, and day after day had our officers and members to interrupt people speaking of the theosophical movement by putting in more or less emphatic protests against Theosophy being referred to as a 'religion,' and the Theosophical Society as a kind of church or religious body. Still worse, it is as often spoken of as a 'new sect'!"

Thesis author has written that, according to the major founder of the movement, Theosophy can not be called either a "religion" or sect in the usual sense of the word. Blavatsky asks the rhetorical question, whether this confusion is the result of deep-rooted prejudice or simply a mistake due to lack of information. And at the same time she suggests that the frank cynics and slanderers don't miss an opportunity with labels "ism" or "sect" to engender a sense of distrust. She says that the opinion of the absolute majority simply is not true. (Note: Reaffirming Blavatsky's statement, professor Robert Ellwood wrote that the Theosophical Society is not a church or religious institution in the usual sense: "Many theosophists, including myself, are also members of a church or other religious organizations. Theosophists include Christians, Hindus, Buddhists, and others." An American Trappist monk Thomas Merton has noted that the mystics of one religion may sometimes feel greater affinity to the mystics of other religions than to the ordinary adherent of the same religion. In professor Julia Shabanova's opinion, unlike religion, in Theosophy there are no "dogmas and cults" that separate different churches.)

=== Against blind faith ===
Kalnitsky wrote that, in Blavatsky's opinion, dogmatic religions are the antithesis of objectivity and dull thinking that does not correspond to the theosophical principles. And she says that the main task of the Theosophical movement has always been a struggle with such beliefs. He has quoted her article:

"Moreover, the very raison d'être of the Theosophical Society was, from its beginning, to utter a loud protest and lead an open warfare against dogma or any belief based upon blind faith."

According to thesis comments, this raison d'être characterized here as a corrective impulse, expressed in the form of "loud protest" and "open warfare" against the status quo. The objects of the same discontent are "rigid dogmatic" positions. Criticism is directed specifically at the prevailing attitude when thoughtless decision is preferable, but not an unhindered investigation. In this regard, Blavatsky states that "the best recruits" of the theosophical movement came from the camp of agnosticism or materialism, where the process of discussion is more free and not constrained by dogma. Thesis author wrote that essence of her logic is such that the more difficult to overcome personal biases, if they have a Christian origin, because science, at least, approve objectivity, while "Christianity preaches exclusivity."

=== Theosophical definition of religion ===
Kalnitsky has noted that Blavatsky was very concerned about how modern Theosophy is perceived by the public. She once again reiterates that, from her point of view, Theosophy is not a religion, although it is associated with specific religious, philosophical and scientific conceptions, and hence it can give rise to confusion. Nevertheless, from her point of view, Theosophy is presented not as a religion, but as religion itself. This strong assertion assumes that Theosophy is the expression of more sincere religious feeling and more authoritative knowledge and experience than those provided in existing popular forms of religion. Blavatsky feels that Theosophy is able to eliminate the uncomfortable and "distracting social functions of religion," which she considers an "exoteric," and to create an "elite esoteric ideational source," available for qualified, properly trained persons.

Thesis author had asked, "What is the theosophical interpretation of 'Religion itself'?" and has received an answer from the article:

"Religion in the true and only correct sense, is a bond uniting men together—not a particular set of dogmas and beliefs. Now Religion, per se, in its widest meaning is that which binds not only all Men, but also all Beings and all things in the entire Universe into one grand whole. This is our theosophical definition of religion...
Thus Theosophy is not a Religion, we say, but Religion itself, the one bond of unity, which is so universal and all-embracing that no man, as no speck—from gods and mortal down to animals, the blade of grass and atom—can be outside of its light. Therefore, any organization or body of that name must necessarily be a Universal Brotherhood." (Note: John Driscoll noted that the primary teaching of Theosophy is the universal brotherhood of humanity, "Hence springs the preaching of toleration to all persons and to all varieties of belief, e.g. Buddhists, Christians, Atheists.")

=== Spiritual alchemy ===
According to Blavatsky, Kalnitsky wrote, Theosophy "transmutes the apparently base metal of every ritualistic and dogmatic creed (Christianity included) into the gold of fact and truth, and thus truly produces a universal panacea for the ills of mankind." This analogy explains the "difference between the exoteric and the esoteric interpretation of symbols, myths, legends, scriptures, folklore," that is, almost of all forms of cultural material. From the point of view of Blavatsky, Theosophy is a filter, through which must be skipped and "transmuted" all religious attributes. She sincerely believes that "this methodology" is urgently needed to correct the distorted representation of the exoteric side of religion.

In hers opinion, "practical Theosophy is not one science" because it covers all the existing sciences of spiritual and physical life. It can be called a global "mentor" or teacher of universal knowledge, experience, and erudition, designed to not only to help "his pupils" successfully pass exams in all kinds of scientific and moral activity in this earthly life, but also to prepare them for the next lives. To do this, it is necessary to "study the universe and its mysteries" looking through oneself, and not "through the spectacles of orthodox science and religions."

=== Source of wisdom ===
Kalnitsky noted that, according to the "myth of origins" of the Theosophical doctrine, the original truth of the universe was first transferred "to the ancestors of the human race" by spiritually advanced beings in a much greater extent than is assumed in the exoteric approach. "The original revelation extra-cosmic truth" (i. e. the transfer of the primary spiritual knowledge in the appropriate phase of the cycle) allegedly was carried out by spiritually elevated wise beings who were sure that this esoteric knowledge be fixed with the help of the "symbolic encoding" and tradition "spiritually mature" and correctly oriented interpreters. Transfer of the original truth is a necessary part of the "evolutionary scheme," and involved in this spiritually advanced beings must ensure that the "primordial wisdom" will be available in all "circumstances and conditions," albeit in a veiled or secret form.

Blavatsky writes about the "spiritually advanced wise beings" as follows (and Kalnitsky has cited this):

"So-called 'Occultism', or rather Esoteric Science, has to be traced in its origin to those Beings who, led by Karma, have incarnated in our humanity, and thus struck the key-note of that secret Science which countless generations of subsequent adepts have expanded since then in every age, while they checked its doctrines by personal observation and experience. The bulk of this knowledge—which no man is able to possess in its fulness—constitutes that which we now call Theosophy or 'divine knowledge'." (Note: A Russian philosopher Vladimir Solovyov wrote that [Blavatskyan] Theosophy "is not a religion, it is divine knowledge or science. According to the explanation of Mrs. Blavatsky, the very term applies not to God, but to the gods or to any divine being, and it is not God's wisdom, but the divine wisdom, i. e. that belongs to the gods at all.")

Also a religious studies scholar Tim Rudbøg wrote that, according to Blavatsky, "Theosophy is not a religion, a science or a philosophy—but Religion, Science and Philosophy in the singular... She also argued that the statement 'Theosophy is not a Religion' by no means excludes the fact that 'Theosophy is Religion' thereby implying that Theosophy in its abstract sense is not a particular religion but the basis of all religions. The definition Blavatsky offered for Religion in singular was not a set of dogmas, but a bond uniting all men, and in its wider sense uniting everything in the universe."

Blavatsky argues that the unity of everything in the universe is in itself implies and justifies the belief in the existence of the Theosophical knowledge "at once scientific, philosophical and religious," demonstrating the reality of the interconnectedness of all beings and objects of the universe. This "knowledge, therefore, becomes essentially Religion, and must be called in its integrity and universality by the distinctive name of Wisdom-Religion." (Note: A Russian religious studies scholar Vladimir Trefilov claimed that Blavatsky's doctrine was formed from the beginning as a synthesis of philosophical views and religious forms of various ages and peoples with modern scientific ideas.)

=== Prejudices and misconceptions ===
Blavatsky writes that "the parent trunk" of all religions and philosophical systems contains the "great Truth" that to date was hidden, distorted or simply ignored. She believes that The Secret Doctrine is book, in which is set out everything that can be transmitted to humanity in "this century", and it is an attempt to clear a part of the "common foundation" of all—great and small religious and philosophical systems. Kalnitsky has cited: "It was found indispensable to tear away all this mass of concreted misconceptions and prejudice which now hides the parent trunk of (a) all the great world-religions; (b) of the smaller sects; and (c) of Theosophy as it stands now—however veiled the great Truth, by ourselves and our limited knowledge."

Blavatsky believes that prejudice and misconceptions have accumulated quite a lot, because they were created by great crowd, and it as theosophists attempt to deal with them has led to the fact that an attack on all theosophical writers and the Society itself have become permanent. Even their friends and readers of theosophical journals often characterize an attempt to deal with errors as merciless "attacks on Christianity," "untheosophical assaults" and so on. She writes:

"Yet these are necessary, nay, indispensable, if we wish to plough up at least approximate truths. We have to lay things bare, and are ready to suffer for it—as usual. It is vain to promise to give truth, and then leave it mingled with error out of mere faint-heartedness... Our 'masterly policy of inactivity', and playing at hide-and-seek in the shadow of dreary metaphysics, have only led to Theosophy being seriously regarded as a religious sect."

== Criticism ==
Contrary to the allegations of Blavatsky which she made in her article, professor John Melton wrote that Theosophy is "established religious cult" along with Christian Science, Rosicrucianism, Spiritualism, Satanism, Mormonism, and so on. René Guénon called Blavatskian Theosophy "theosophism" and described it in his book as a "pseudo-religion." (Note: Professor Olav Hammer noted that W. Judge, one of the founders of the Theosophical Society, called Theosophy "scientific religion, or religious science.") He believed that Blavatsky's "theosophism" is a "confused mixture" of Neoplatonism, Gnosticism, Jewish Kabbalah, Hermeticism, and occultism. The Catholic Encyclopedia noted that Blavatsky's doctrine is a "strange mixture" of mysticism and charlatanism and issued a verdict: "The denial of a personal God nullifies its claim to be a spiritualistic philosophy." Kalnitsky stated:

"The movement that Madame Blavatsky began may be classified as an important foundational legitimator of later NRMs, directly or indirectly influencing other schools, groups, individuals, and thus, spreading elements of its ideational structure into society at large."

In support of his words Kalnitsky refers to the British scholar of religious studies George Chryssides and professor John Melton.

== Publications ==
- "Is Theosophy a Religion?". Lucifer. 3 (15). London: Theosophical Publishing Society: 177–187. November 1888.
- De Zirkoff, B., ed. (1964). "Is Theosophy a Religion?". Collected Writings. Vol. 10. Wheaton, Ill: Theosophical Publishing House. pp. 159–74.

=== Translations ===
- "Теософия — это религия?" [Is Theosophy a Religion?]. Астральные тела и двойники [Astral Bodies and Doppelgangers]. Белый Лотос (in Russian). Москва: Сфера. 2000. pp. 89–109. ISBN 5850000879.
- "Теософия — это религия?" [Is Theosophy a Religion?]. Происхождение Начал [Origin of Primary Sources]. Елена Блаватская потомкам (in Russian). Москва: Сфера. 2006. ISBN 5939751644.

== See also ==
- Buddhism and Theosophy
- Christianity and Theosophy
- Hinduism and Theosophy
- Esoteric Buddhism
- "The Esoteric Character of the Gospels"
- The Key to Theosophy
- "Philosophers and Philosophicules"
- Theosophy and literature
- Theosophy and Western philosophy
- "What Are The Theosophists?"
- "What Is Theosophy?"
