= The Key to Theosophy =

1889 book by Helena Blavatsky

- Cover of the first edition
- Author: Helena Blavatsky
- Subject: Theosophy
- Published: 1889
- Media type: Print

The Key to Theosophy is an 1889 book by Helena Blavatsky, expounding the principles of theosophy in a readable question-and-answer manner. It covers Theosophy and the Theosophical Society, Nature of the Human Being, Life After Death, Reincarnation, Kama-Loka and Devachan, the Human Mind, Practical Theosophy and the Mahatmas. The book is an introduction to Theosophical mysticism and esoteric doctrine.

Nonviolent activist Mohandas Gandhi spoke of it in his autobiography:

"This book stimulated in me the desire to read books on Hinduism, and disabused me of the notion fostered by the missionaries that Hinduism was rife with superstition."

== See also ==
- "Is Theosophy a Religion?"
- Theosophy and Buddhism
- Christianity and Theosophy
- Theosophy and Western philosophy
- "What Is Theosophy?"
