= Lucifer (magazine) =

Journal published by Helena Blavatsky

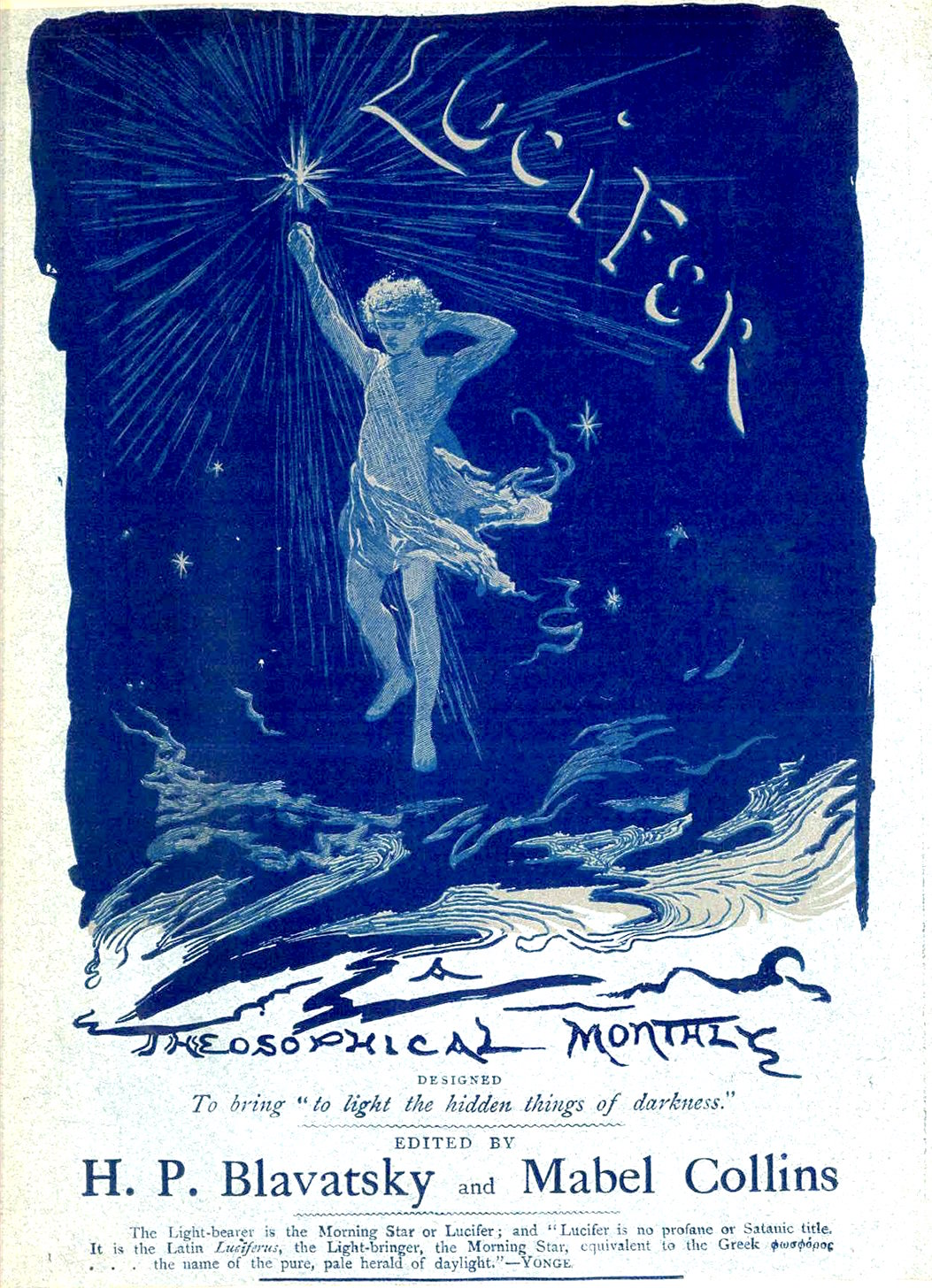
- Editor: Helena Blavatsky
- Categories: Theosophy
- Frequency: Monthly
- First issue: 1887
- Final issue: 1897
- Country: United Kingdom
- Based in: London
- Language: English
- ISSN: 2399-0295
- OCLC: 1697218

Lucifer was a journal published by Helena Blavatsky. The first edition was issued in September 1887 in London. The journal published articles on philosophical, theosophical, scientific and religious topics. It also contained book reviews, for example of Friedrich Nietzsche's Thus Spoke Zarathustra.

== History ==
The journal was first published by Blavatsky. The first issues were co-edited with Mabel Collins. From 1889 until Blavatsky's death in May 1891 Annie Besant was a co-editor. Besant then published the journal until September 1895, when George Robert Stowe Mead became a co-editor. The journal appeared twelve times a year and was 80 to 90 pages long. The last of twenty volumes was published in August 1897. More than 2800 articles were published in this journal between 1887 and 1897. Contributing authors included W. B. Yeats. Blavatsky’s "Luciferian" editorials provided inspiration to generations of adept esoteric writers that were to follow.

In September 1897 the journal was replaced by The Theosophical Review.

In 1979, the Theosophical Society in the Netherlands began publishing a Dutch Lucifer. In 2013, the English version of the magazine was resurrected.

== See also ==
- "Is Theosophy a Religion?"
- "Philosophers and Philosophicules"
- "The Esoteric Character of the Gospels"
- The Theosophist
