= What Is Theosophy? =

1879 religious magazine editorial

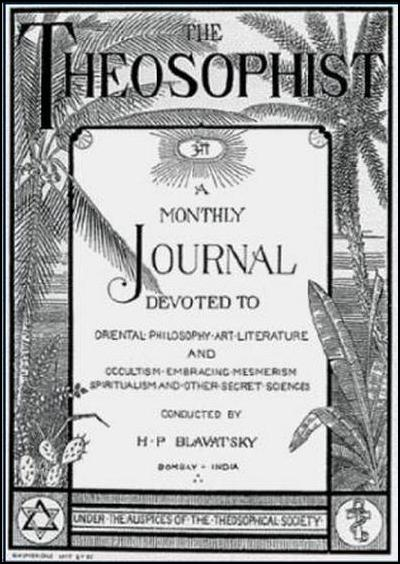
Cover of a magazine The Theosophist, Bombay.

"What Is Theosophy?" is an editorial published in October 1879 in the Theosophical magazine The Theosophist. It was compiled by Helena Blavatsky (Note: The Theosophist, Vol. 1, No. 1, October, 1879, pp. 2–5.) and included into the 2nd volume of the Blavatsky Collected Writings. According to a doctoral thesis by Tim Rudbøg, in this "important" article Blavatsky "began conceptualizing her idea of 'Theosophy'."

== Analysis of contents ==
=== Definition of Theosophy ===
Blavatsky writes that, "according to lexicographers, the term theosophia is composed of two Greek words—theos "god," and sophos "wise." She then writes that Noah Webster defines it as "a supposed intercourse with God and superior spirits, and consequent attainment of superhuman knowledge, by physical processes, as by the theurgic operations of some ancient Platonists, or by the chemical processes of the German fire-philosophers." (Note: Santucci has specified that it mentions here "the theurgy of the Neoplatonists, such as Iamblichus, and the fire-philosophers," who were described, for example, by Hargrave Jennings.) Professor James Santucci wrote that the article author considers this interpretation unsuccessful, calling it "a poor and flippant explanation." (Note: Blavatsky then explains a term "Theosophy," describing who a Theosophist is. To this aim, she uses Vaughan's definition.) In hers opinion, Robert Vaughan has proposed "a far better, more philosophical" definition: "A Theosophist is one who gives you a theory of God or the works of God, which has not revelation, but an inspiration of his own for its basis." (Note: Both Santucci and Rudbøg did not notice that Blavatsky inexactly quotes Vaughan: there must be a word "reason" instead of "revelation.") She continues:

"In this view every great thinker and philosopher, especially every founder of a new religion, school of philosophy, or sect, is necessarily a Theosophist. Hence, Theosophy and Theosophists have existed ever since the first glimmering of nascent thought made man seek instinctively for the means of expressing his own independent opinions."

Both Alexander Senkevich and Tim Rudbøg stated that, to fully define Theosophy, Blavatsky proposes to consider it "under all its aspects." Both Santucci and Rudbøg have quoted in the article:

"The interior world has not been hidden from all by impenetrable darkness. By that higher intuition acquired by Theosophia—or God-knowledge, which carries the mind from the world of form into that of formless spirit, man has been sometimes enabled in every age and every country to perceive things in the interior or invisible world." (Note: Vladimir Solovyov wrote that, according to the explanation of Blavatsky, hers Theosophy "is not a religion, but it is divine knowledge or science," and the very term applies not to God, but to the gods or to any divine being, and it is not God's wisdom, but the divine wisdom, i. e. that belongs to the gods at all.) (Note: Origin of this term, according to the founders of [Blavatskian] Theosophy, goes back to the schools of the Neoplatonists, but the earliest elements of Theosophy were formed in ancient India, and a word "Theosophy" have its Sanskrit equivalent—"Brahmavidya" (Divine Wisdom).)

Santucci wrote that among the Theosophical ancestors, mentioned further by the article author, were the Hindu ascetics, the Neoplatonists, the Rosicrucians or Fire-philosophers, and other mystics. According to Blavatsky, they were all involved in "the search after man's diviner 'self'," which accompanied the theurgy she described. Santucci stated that, according to Iamblichus, theurgy is, as Blavatsky points in hers article, "the art of applying the divine powers of man to the subordination of the blind forces of nature." This "search" was often viewed "as individual communion with a personal God", and although this was not true, it was the aim of every mystic at all times. (Note: The inner divinity is referred [in Theosophy] to by different names: the Uncreate, the inner God, the higher Self, and the Master; alliance with this divine self induces wisdom.)

Senkevich wrote that the article author quotes Alfred Russel Wallace, F.R.S., a spiritualist who, as she writes, "with brave candour" claimed:

"It is 'spirit' that alone feels, and perceives, and thinks—that acquires knowledge, and reasons and aspires... there not unfrequently occur individuals so constituted that the spirit can perceive independently of the corporeal organs of sense, or can perhaps, wholly or partially, quit the body for a time and return to it again... the spirit... communicates with spirit easier than with matter."

Santucci stated that Theosophy or "Divine Wisdom", according to Blavatsky, is the Highest Truth about God, the universe and man, "It is a Truth that in its pure form is primordial, in that it existed from the dawn of Humanity; esoteric, since only those few individuals capable of understanding such knowledge are allowed to receive it; and universal, because all great minds throughout the world enunciated the same Wisdom." Rudbøg wrote that this article is the first example in which Blavatsky's "concept of a 'Wisdom-Religion' is directly correlated with 'Theosophy'." He quoted: "Theosophy is, then, the archaic Wisdom-Religion, the esoteric doctrine once known in every ancient country having claims to civilization." (Note: Alvin Boyd Kuhn wrote: "German pietism expressed fundamentally Theosophic ideas through Eckhardt, Tauler, Suso, and Jacob Boehme... In fact there was hardly a period when the ghosts of occult wisdom did not hover in the background of European thought.") Both Tim Rudbøg and Julia Shabanova have cited Blavatsky's definition of Theosophy as the Wisdom-Religion:

"This 'Wisdom' all the old writings show us as an emanation of the divine Principle; and the clear comprehension of it is typified in such names as the Indian Budha, the Babylonian Nebo, the Thoth of Memphis, the Hermes of Greece; in the appellations, also, of some goddesses—Metis, Neitha, Athena, the Gnostic Sophia, and finally the Vedas, from the word 'to know'."

=== Basic idea of Theosophy ===
James Santucci wrote that Theosophy, according to Blavatsky, "refers to a nexus of teachings associated with the Supreme, the macrocosmos (the universe or Nature), and microcosmos (humanity)." He noted that in her article she first presents the statement on "a single Supreme Essence, Unknown and Unknowable" which was the "central idea of the Eclectic Theosophy." (Note: This statement was later developed by the author in the poem to The Secret Doctrine where it is said that there is "an Omnipresent, Eternal, Boundless, and Immutable Principle on which all speculation is impossible, since it transcends the power of human conception and could only be dwarfed by any human expression or similitude.") (Note: In The New Encyclopedia of Philosophy it is said Blavatsky's Theosophy is a "mystical-religious doctrine based on faith in Absolute as Unfathomable God, on the law of karma, reincarnation of soul, and an idea of infinite cosmic evolution.")

Professor Julia Shabanova wrote that an idea of Theosophy was not alien to German idealism, with which were traditionally associated rationalism and even panlogism; this is about "that Theosophy which", as Blavatsky argues, "prompted such men as Hegel, Fichte and Spinoza to take up the labors of the old Grecian philosophers and speculate upon the One Substance—the Deity, the Divine All proceeding from the Divine Wisdom—incomprehensible, unknown and unnamed—by any ancient or modern religious philosophy." (Note: Schelling used the term "Theosophy" to designate the synthesis of mystical cognition of God and rational philosophy; together it is possible here to refer the concept of "free Theosophy" by Vladimir Solovyov.) Having mentioned these manifestations of Theosophy, the article author declares:

"Every Theosophist, then, holding to a theory of the Deity 'which has not revelation, but an inspiration of his own for its basis,' may accept any of the above definitions or belong to any of these religions, and yet remain strictly within the boundaries of Theosophy. For the latter is belief in the Deity as the All, the source of all existence, the infinite that cannot be either comprehended or known, the universe alone revealing It, or, as some prefer it, Him, thus giving a sex to that, to anthropomorphize which is blasphemy."

Shabanova wrote that Blavatsky points to the Theosophical method of the consciousness developing, quoting "superb," in hers opinion, essay on The Oversoul by Ralph Emerson, "I, the imperfect, adore my own perfect." She refers Plotinus, who counted that the secret gnosis, or the knowledge of Theosophy, has "three degrees—opinion, science, and illumination." Blavatsky continues the cite: "The means or instrument of the first is sense, or perception; of the second, dialectics; of the third, intuition. To the last, reason is subordinate; it is absolute knowledge, founded on the identification of the mind with the object known." She then writes, "Theosophy is the exact science of psychology, so to say; it stands in relation to natural, uncultivated mediumship, as the knowledge of a Tyndall stands to that of a school-boy in physics." (Note: "To Blavatsky, Theosophy was empirically verifiable (through science, psychic powers, and history).")

== Criticism of Theosophy ==
Both the explicit ideological opponents of Blavatsky's doctrine and the Western esotericism scholars who claim for objectivity are equally interested in separating modern Theosophy from the classical one. (Note: Professor Joscelyn Godwin in his 1994 work used the following terminology, "Theosophy and Theosophists, with a capital T, refer to Blavatsky's society and its members, theosophy and theosophers refer to the tradition of religious illumination exemplified by Jacob Boehme and his followers." Also Santucci stated, "'Theosophy,' with a capital 'T,' represents the modern Theosophy of the Theosophical societies, while theosophy (with a lower-case 't') represents other and usually earlier forms of theosophy.") For example, according to Nikolai Berdyaev, "contemporary 'theosophical' movements" corrupted the beautiful word 'Theosophy' and "have made us forget" the existence of a genuine "Christian theosophy". He believed that modern Theosophy does not represent a synthesis of religion, philosophy and science, as its adherents say, but there is a "mixture" of them, in which there is no real religion, no real philosophy, no real science. (Note: Nevertheless, professor Nicholas Goodrick-Clarke noted that, in contrast to the Boehmian theosophy, Blavatskian Theosophy, "adapting contemporary scientific ideas," raised the concept of "spiritual evolution through countless worlds and eras.")

In professor Antoine Faivre's opinion, that what Blavatsky called "Theosophy" was in fact only her own doctrine. René Guénon believed that "theosophism" is a "confused mixture" of Neoplatonism, Gnosticism, Jewish Kabbalah, Hermeticism, and occultism. A religious philosopher Sergius Bulgakov stated that [Blavatskian] Theosophy, trying to replace religion with itself, turns into a "vulgar pseudoscientific mythology."

== Publications ==
- Blavatsky, Helena (October 1879). "What Is Theosophy?" (PDF). The Theosophist. 1 (1). Bombay: Theosophical Society: 2–5.
- Blavatsky, Helena (1967). "What Is Theosophy?". In Zirkoff, B. De (ed.). Blavatsky Collected Writings. Vol. 2. Wheaton, Ill: Theosophical Publishing House. pp. 87–97.

== See also ==
- "Is Theosophy a Religion?"
- Theosophy and Buddhism
- Theosophy and Christianity
- Theosophy and Hinduism
- Theosophy and literature
- Theosophy and visual arts
- Theosophy and Western philosophy
- "What Are The Theosophists?"
