= The Theosophist =

August 1931 edition depicting original cover from 1879

The Theosophist is the monthly journal of the international Theosophical Society based in Adyar, India. It was founded in India in 1879 by Helena Blavatsky, who was also its editor. The journal is still being published till date. For the year 1930, the journal was published in Hollywood, California by Annie Besant and Marie Russak Hotchener, but it returned to Adyar in 1931. The journal features articles about philosophy, art, literature and occultism.

== The Theosophical Society ==
The Theosophical Society was officially formed in New York City, United States, on 17 November 1875 by Helena Petrovna Blavatsky, Colonel Henry Steel Olcott, William Quan Judge, and others. The society's initial objective was the "study and elucidation of Occultism, the Cabala etc."

It established its roots in India in 1879, winning its supporters by its portrayal of sympathy for the native population, by its enthusiasm for the Aryan philosophy, and by its strange dogmas and obscure beliefs. The main objectives of the society were to establish British India as a center of the Universal Brotherhood of Humanity, to study the Aryan culture and to explore the hidden mysteries and inherent powers in men.

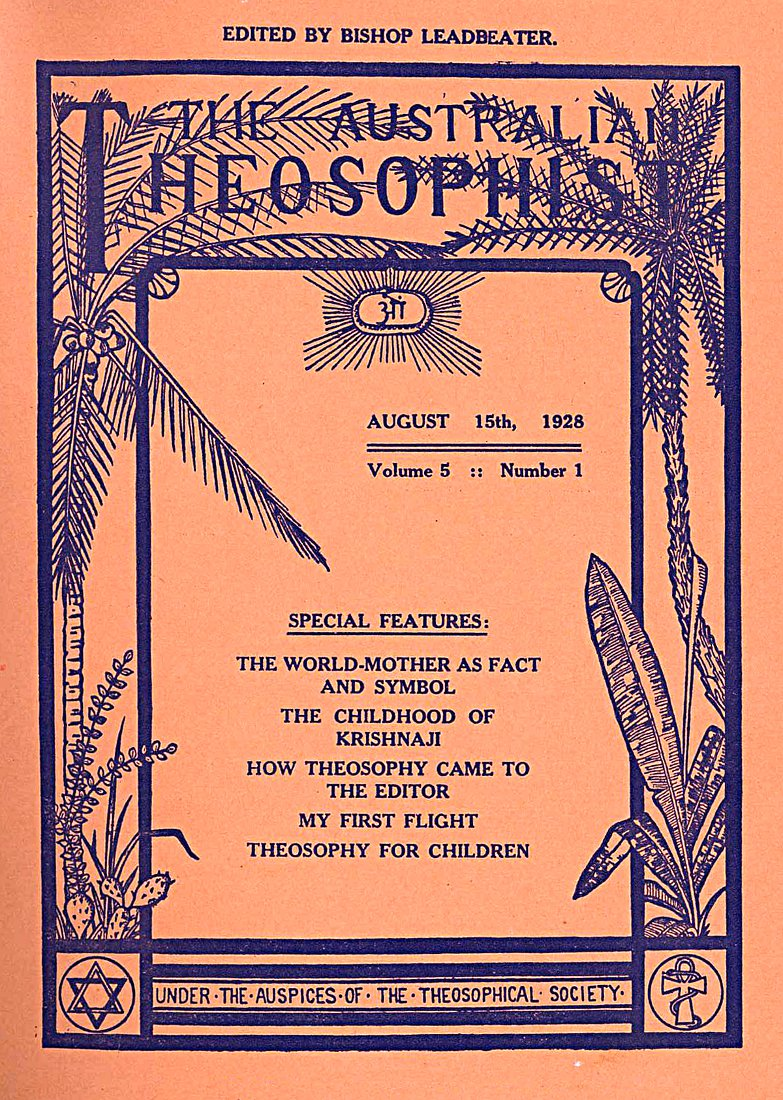
The widespread influence of The Theosophist extended to many parts of the world.

The first centre was established in Bombay, but the society soon installed a network of branches throughout India, and its journal, The Theosophist, was circulated extensively throughout the three Presidencies.

== History ==
Due to its widespread circulation, The Theosophist has been heavily linked with the politics of British India. Despite not explicitly stating any political agendas as of yet, it has been associated with the formation of Congress.

According to the later account of Annie Besant, it was discovered that the decision to convene the first Congress in Madras was taken on the recommendation of the Theosophical Society after its convention of December 1884. The success of the periodical publications of the journal has been identified as an encouragement for many of the Indian leaders to experiment by forming an Indian political congress.

Until 1909, The Theosophist was printed by Messrs. Thompson & Co., Printers, in Madras (now Chennai). The journey between headquarters in Adyar and the printer in Madras was troublesome as it involved a jolting carriage ride that could take an hour each way. Colonel Olcott wished to have a printing company at Adyar for the journal and other publications, but that did not occur until 1909, when the Vasanṭā Press was established under the presidency of Annie Besant. Hand-powered equipment was used for printing initially. In October 1911, a larger type was introduced for improved legibility. The number of copies printed grew from 400 in the first issue to 800 in 1909 and 4000 two years later.

In 1936, President George S. Arundale reshaped the journal into being more of a magazine for a general readership. He appointed an American Editorial Committee that was associated with the Editorial Board at Adyar. The three members were Fritz Kunz, Professor H. Douglas Wild, and Claude Bragdon. The announcement stated:

"Beginning with January, 1936, The Theosophist will be edited as far as possible in the interest of the general public, publishing articles which will relate religion, science, philosophy, psychology, politics, industry, etc., to the science of Theosophy in a manner calculated to arouse the interest of the public. The Theosophical World, an enlargement of Adyar News, will keep members in touch with the Society's special affairs and growth.

The American Editorial Committee has been requested to cooperate in the publication of The Theosophist through personal contributions, through gathering contributions from other qualified writers, and also, if possible, by making arrangements for advertisements."

== See also ==
- How Theosophy Came to Me
- Lucifer magazine
- "What Are The Theosophists?"
- "What Is Theosophy?"
