= Buddhism and Theosophy =

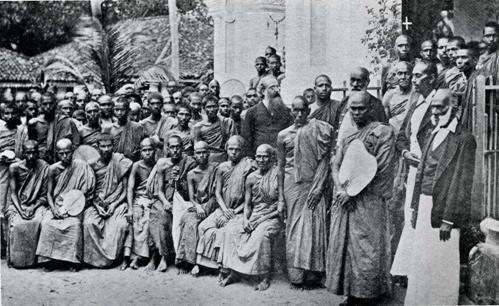
The Buddhists and Colonel Olcott in Colombo (1883)

Theosophical teachings have borrowed some concepts and terms from Buddhism. Some theosophists like Helena Blavatsky, Helena Roerich and Henry Steel Olcott also became Buddhists. Henry Steel Olcott helped shape the design of the Buddhist flag. Theosophists including Evans-Wentz and Alexandra David-Neel, played a role in popularizing Tibetan Buddhism in the west.

== The Theosophists as Buddhists and Buddhologists ==
=== The Founders of the Theosophical Society ===
25 May 1880 Blavatsky and Olcott embraced Buddhism: they publicly took in Galle the Refuges and Pancasila from a prominent Sinhalese bhikkhu. (Note: Along with them embraced Buddhism an active member of the Theosophical Society Damodar K. Mavalankar, who renounced caste Brahmin and worked at headquarters TS.) Olcott and Blavatsky (she received US citizenship previously) were the first Americans who were converted to Buddhism in the traditional sense.

In Buddhology there is an idea that the "Theosophical Buddhists" were the forerunners of all subsequent Western, or, as they were called, "white" Buddhists. In addition, they attempted to rationalize Buddhism, to cleanse the doctrine, removing from it elements of "folk superstition". They also tried to identify Buddhism with esoteric doctrine, recognizing the Lord Buddha as the "Master-Adept." (Note: Blavatsky called her mysterious Masters an "esoteric Buddhists".) (Note: Blavatsky claimed that before her arrival in America she studied for seven years in Tibet under the direction of mahatmas, and that later she maintained telepathic contact with them, especially with the Masters Kuthumi and Morya – sometimes through dreams and visions, but most of all, through letters, which materialized in her room in a cupboard, or she wrote down them herself by automatic writing.) And finally, they considered it their duty to provide assistance and political support to the oppressed Sinhalese Buddhists. (Note: Melton wrote that Olcott become an avid supporter of Buddhism and a defender of the Sri Lankan Buddhists.)

Theosophical revival of Buddhism

In 1880 Olcott began to build up the Buddhist Educational Movement in Ceylon. In 1880 there were only two schools in Ceylon managed by the Buddhists. Due to the efforts of Olcott the number rose to 205 schools and four colleges in 1907 (Ananda College in Colombo, Mahinda College in Galle, Dharmaraja College in Kandy and Maliyadeva College in Kurunegala). Thus began the great Buddhist revival in Ceylon. Olcott also represented the Buddhist cause to the British government, and found redress for the restrictions imposed against Buddhists, such as the prohibition of processions, Buddhist schools, the improved financial administration of temple properties, and so on.

Olcott "united the sects of Ceylon in the Buddhist Section of the Theosophical Society (1880); the 12 sects of Japan into a Joint Committee for the promotion of Buddhism (1889); Burma, Siam, and Ceylon into a Convention of Southern Buddhists (1891); and finally Northern and Southern Buddhism through joint signatures to his Fourteen Propositions of Buddhism (1891)."

=== Anagarika Dharmapala ===
An important part of Olcott's work in Ceylon became the patronage of young Buddhist Don David Hewavitharana, who took himself later name Anagarika Dharmapala. (Note: Thanks to Blavatsky and Olcott, David in 1880 was open to the world, and he joined the efforts of Olcott on the revival of Buddhism in Ceylon.) Dharmapala, a founder the Maha Bodhi Society, Sri Lanka's national hero, was one of the major figures in the movement for the revival of Buddhism in Ceylon during the British colonial rule. (Note: Similarly Olcott is considered a leading figure in the modern history of Sri Lankan Buddhism.)

In December 1884 Blavatsky, accompanied by Leadbeater and the marrieds Cooper-Oakley came to Ceylon. Leadbeater, following the example of the leaders of the Theosophical Society, has officially become a Buddhist, without renouncing Christianity (he was an Anglican priest). David joined the Blavatsky's team to go to India. (Note: Previously David received permission of his father. But the day of departure the father changed his mind, because he had a bad dream. The situation was resolved by Blavatsky: she told the father that if David will not be allowed to leave, he will die. Finally Blavatsky led David "by his hand up the gangplank.")

Upon arrival in India Dharmapala as a member of the Theosophical Society worked with Blavatsky and Olcott. They advised him to devote himself to the service of "the benefit of mankind," and begin to study Pali and the Buddhist philosophy. Sangharakshita wrote that at the age of 20 years Dharmapala was equally fascinated by both Buddhism and theosophy.

After returning from India, Dharmapala worked in Colombo as general secretary of the Buddhist section of the Theosophical Society, and as director of the Buddhist press. In 1886, he was a translator, when together with Olcott and Leadbeater made a lecture tour of the island. He helped Olcott in a work on the organization of Buddhist schools. When Olcott instructed Leadbeater to prepare a shortened version of the Buddhist Catechism, Dharmapala undertook to translate it to Sinhala. (Note: The Smaller Buddhist Catechism was approved and recommended for the instruction of Buddhist children by Hikkaduwe Sri Sumangala Thero. It was translated into Sinhala by Anagarika Dharmapala (published in two parts in 1889).) Work of Dharmapala and theosophists contributed to the revival of Buddhism in Sri Lanka and other countries of the Southern Buddhism.

Leadbeater has initiated the organization in various parts of Colombo a large number of Buddhist Sunday schools. He also founded an English school, which later became known as Ananda College (one of the most famous schools of Ceylon). Among the pupils of this school was a young Buddhist Jinarajadasa, who later worked as the fourth President of the Theosophical Society Adyar. (Note: Speaking of himself, Jinarajadasa noted: "I am a Buddhist by birth; but I am a Theosophist first and a Buddhist after.") (Note: June 23, 1886 Blavatsky has sent a letter to Leadbeater in which were rows relating to Sri Lankan Buddhists: "My love and blessings to Don David and all the Brethren. My greatest respectful salams to the High Priest Rev. Sumangala. Ask his blessing to me.")

In 1893, Dharmapala went to the West, first to England and then to the Chicago, where he represented Buddhism at the World Parliament of Religions. Although he was only 29 years old, he was the most famous representative of Buddhism in parliament. At the conference, he made several appearances on three main themes. Firstly, he said that Buddhism is a religion, which perfectly consistent with modern science, because the Buddhist teachings are completely compatible with the doctrine of evolution. He outlined the Buddhist idea that the cosmos is a sequential process of deployment in accordance with the laws of nature. Secondly, Dharmapala said that in the ethics of Buddhism is much more love and compassion than in the sermons of Christian missionaries working in Ceylon. By a third paragraph of his performances was the assertion that Buddhism is a religion of optimism and activity, but in any case not of pessimism and inactivity.

=== Christmas Humphreys ===
In 1924 in London Humphreys founded the Buddhist Lodge of the Theosophical Society. (Note: Oldmeadow wrote that theosophy, occultism and Buddhism are intricately intertwined in the individual of Humphreys.) According to Humphreys, conceptually the Theosophy and Buddhism are identical: the single life after many incarnations returns to the Unmanifest; all the individual consciousness are unreal compared to the "Self", which is a reflection of the Absolute; karma and reincarnation are a basic laws. Path lays through self-fulfillment with Nirvana in the end. Thus, wrote Humphreys, the difference between the Theosophy and Buddhism is only in emphasis. (Note: Humphreys claimed that the theosophy is concentrated wisdom of mankind.)

Thanks to the missionary efforts of Dharmapala, in 1926 the British Buddhists established their branch Maha Bodhi Society. At the same time the Buddhist Lodge was transformed into the British Buddhist Society, whose president become Humphreys. Humphreys was a tireless lay Buddhist as a lecturer, journalist, writer and organizer. He was the author and/or the editor of The Buddhist Lodge Monthly Bulletin, Buddhism in England, The Middle Way, and The Theosophical Review.

=== Watts and Conze ===
British philosopher and Buddhist author Alan Watts became a member of the Buddhist Lodge of the Theosophical Society in London at the age of 15. His first book, The Spirit of Zen came out when he was 19 years old. (Note: Humphreys first met with Watts in the early 1930s.)

Another active member of the Theosophical Society was Edward Conze, who later became a famous buddhologist. (Note: Edward Conze remained a theosophist throughout his life.) (Note: One of the most famous buddhologists 20th century Edward Conze was a theosophist.)

=== D. Suzuki and B. Suzuki ===
The famous Buddhist philosopher and popularizer of Zen D. T. Suzuki and his wife Beatrice Suzuki became members of the Theosophical Society in Tokyo in 1920; their names appear on the list of Theosophical Society members sent to Adyar on 12 May 1920. After moving to Kyoto in 1924, the Suzukis formed a new branch of the Theosophical Society called the Mahayana Lodge. Most of the Lodge members were university professors. In 1937 Jinarajadasa, future president of the Theosophical Society, read two lectures in Tokyo which were translated into Japanese by D. T. Suzuki.

== Analysis of the theosophical texts ==
According to buddhologists Reigle and Taylor, Blavatsky herself, and her immediate Masters, and the Master of her Masters were Buddhists by faith and lexis, who were strongly associated by relationships "pupil-teacher". Blavatsky often uses in her works the references to Buddhism, in particular, to the Mahayana teachings, while in the "mahatma letters" Buddhism is present on virtually every page, and it is immediately evident from the frequent use of specific terminology on the Sanskrit, Pali, Tibetan, Chinese and Mongolian languages.

=== The Mahatma letters ===
Humphreys wrote that theosophists got their knowledge from two Masters who prepared Blavatsky for her mission in the world. Their letters were published later, in 1923: it was a book The Mahatma Letters to A. P. Sinnett. He noted that the founders of the theosophical movement, Blavatsky and Olcott, publicly declared themselves Buddhists and, more important still, the two Masters, who founded the Theosophical movement, spoke: "Our Great Patron is the Teacher of Nirvana and the Law." And their Master, the Maha-Chohan, once said, describing himself and his fellow-adepts, that they were all "the devoted followers of the spirit incarnate of absolute self-sacrifice, of philanthropy, divine kindness, as of all the highest virtues attainable on this earth of sorrow, the man of men, Gautama Buddha." Speaking about Buddha, Humphries repeatedly quoted the Master Kuthumi, (Note: "Koot Hoomi... is not the Master's personal name, but the title of his office as a high dignitary of the Koothoompa sect of Tibetan Buddhism.") for example:

- "Our great Buddha—the patron of all the adepts, the reformer and the codifier of the occult system."
- "In our temples there is neither a god nor gods worshipped, only the thrice sacred memory of the greatest as the holiest man that ever lived."

Humphreys stated: "All who dare to call themselves Theosophists or Buddhists must study, and teach and strive to apply this garnered Wisdom."

=== The Secret Doctrine and the Books of Kiu-te ===
Oldmeadow wrote that Blavatsky's second major work, The Secret Doctrine, includes elements that clearly derive from the Vajrayana, often conflated with Vedantic ideas. He noted: "Lama Kazi Dawa Samdup was sufficiently confident of Blavatsky's account of the Bardo to endorse her claim that she had been initiated into 'the higher lamaistic teachings'."

Lama Kazi Dawa Samdup (a translator of The Tibetan Book of the Dead) believed that Blavatsky had "intimate acquaintance with the higher lamaistic teachings". (Note: See The Tibetan Book of the Dead, p. 7 footnote. See also note 24: "The Lama Kazi Dawa Samdup was not only knowledgeable of the Secret Doctrine, like Evans-Wentz, but in a position to confirm the genuineness of some of HPB's statements regarding esoteric Tibetan teachings.")

Humphreys in his autobiography praised The Secret Doctrine. At the time he published an abridgment of this book. (Note: Two of most important Blavatsky's works are The Secret Doctrine and The Voice of the Silence. Hurst wrote: "Blavatsky's Buddhist-influenced book The Secret Doctrine remains influential as a spiritual text and in print after more than a century.")

Buddhologist David Reigle identified Blavatsky's "Books of Kiu-te" as the Tantra section of the Tibetan Buddhist canon.

=== The Voice of the Silence ===
Zen Buddhism scholar D. T. Suzuki wrote about Blavatsky's book The Voice of the Silence: "Undoubtedly Madame Blavatsky had in some way been initiated into the deeper side of Mahayana teaching and then gave out what she deemed wise to the Western world." (Note: He said also: "H. P. Blavatsky was one who had truly attained." // Eastern Buddhist, old series. Vol. 5, p. 377.) He also commented: "Here is the real Mahayana Buddhism." (Note: See The Middle Way, August 1965, p. 90.)

In 1927 the staff of the 9th Panchen Lama Tub-ten Cho-gyi Nyima helped Theosophists put out the "Peking Edition" of The Voice of the Silence. (Note: See Blavatsky H. P. The Voice of the Silence, ed. Alice Cleather and Basil Crump. Peking: Chinese Buddhist Research Society, 1927. — P. 113.)

The 14th Dalai Lama Tenzin Gyatso wrote in the preface to the 1989 Centenary edition of The Voice of the Silence, "I believe that this book has strongly influenced many sincere seekers and aspirants to the wisdom and compassion of the Bodhisattva Path." (Note: See Blavatsky H. P. The Voice of the Silence. Centenary edition. Santa Barbara: Concord Grove Press, 1989. // Foreword by the XIVth Dalai Lama.)

Humphreys wrote: "The Buddhists and Theosophists of the West, all converts, be it noted, from some other faith, have much in common: The Voice of the Silence ('a pure Buddhist work', as the late Anagarika Dharmapala of Ceylon wrote to me, and the Dalai Lama signed my copy long ago) and Colonel Olcott's Buddhist Catechism."

According to Kalnitsky, the contents of The Voice of the Silence reflects "authentic Buddhist sentiment, even if not universally acknowledged as a pure Buddhist historical document."

=== Esoteric Buddhism ===
According to Lopez, the author of Esoteric Buddhism "has a broader view of the Buddha" than that of Western Buddhologists and scholars of Oriental studies. Sinnett stated that the Buddha is simply one of a row "of adepts who have appeared over the course of the centuries." Buddha's next incarnation happened approximately sixty years after his death. He appeared as Shankara, the well-known Vedantic philosopher. Sinnett noted that for the uninitiated it is known that date of Shankara's birth is one thousand years after Buddha's death, and that he was hostile to Buddhism. Sinnett wrote that the Buddha came as Shankara "to fill up some gaps and repair certain errors in his own previous teaching." The Buddha had departed "from the practice of earlier adepts by opening the path" to adeptship to men of all castes. "Although well intentioned, this led" to a deterioration of occult knowledge when it was penetrated into ignominious hands. Sinnett wrote that to further appeared a need "to take no candidates except from the class which, on the whole, by reason of its hereditary advantages, is likely to be the best nursery of fit candidates."
Sinnett claimed that the Buddha's next incarnation was as the great Tibetan adept reformer of the 14th century Tsong-ka-pa.

== Criticism ==
The existence of a hidden or esoteric teaching in Buddhism is not accepted by Theravadin Buddhists. For example, Rhys Davids wrote:

"In this connection I shall doubtless be expected to say a few words on Theosophy, if only because one of the books giving an account of that very curious and widely spread movement has been called Esoteric Buddhism. It has always been a point of wonder to me why the author should have chosen this particular title for his treatise. For if there is anything that can be said with absolute certainty about the book it is, that it is not esoteric, and not Buddhism. The original Buddhism was the very contrary of esoteric." (Note: Nonetheless Humphreys wrote that "Buddha's Teaching was not born from a spiritual vacuum, but was an expression of some portion of that Gupta Vidya 'the accumulated Wisdom of the ages', which antedates all known religions." "Gupta-vidya (Sanskrit) Gupta-vidyā [from gupta from the verbal root gup to conceal, preserve + vidyā knowledge, wisdom] Secret knowledge, secret wisdom; the source of all religions and philosophies known to the world: theosophy, the ancient wisdom-religion, the esoteric philosophy.") (Note: Sinnett received instruction from Tibetan Masters, and Rhys Davids believed that Lamaism was a Religion not only different from Buddhism, but and being in his time in antagonism with the teachings and the institutions of original Buddhism.)

Guénon believed that Blavatskyan "theosophism" is a "confused mixture" of Neoplatonism, Gnosticism, Jewish Kabbalah, Hermeticism, and occultism. He wrote: "From the start this heteroclite mixture was presented as 'esoteric Buddhism'; but since it was still too easy to see that it presented only very vague relationships with true Buddhism."

Oldmeadow claimed:

"Despite the legend which she and her hagiographers propagated, Blavatsky never stepped on Tibetan soil. Her claims that her later writings derived from Himalayan Mahatmas, forming a kind of Atlantean brotherhood residing in secrecy in a remote region of Tibet and with access to longhidden, antediluvian sources of esoteric wisdom, need not be treated seriously."

In 2015 Uditha Devapriya stated that Olcott's Buddhist Catechism was based on the Catholic Catechism, and his schools were by same institutions which he criticised: "This meant that the Buddhism he 'founded' was not the sort of Buddhism which Gunananda Thero began a journey to find."

== See also ==
- Buddhist modernism
- Christianity and Theosophy
- Esoteric Buddhism
- Theosophy and literature
- Roerichism
- Theosophy and Hinduism
- Theosophy and Western philosophy
- Vipassana movement
- Western esotericism and Eastern religions
