= The Mahatma Letters to A.P. Sinnett =

1923 theosophical book by A. Trevor Barker

- Title page for The Mahatma Letters to A.P. Sinnett (1962 edition)
- Author: A. Trevor Barker
- Publication date: 1923
- ISBN: 1-55700-086-7

The Mahatma Letters to A.P. Sinnett is a book published in 1923 by A. Trevor Barker. (ISBN 1-55700-086-7) According to Theosophical teachings, the letters were written between 1880 and 1884 by Koot Hoomi and Morya to A. P. Sinnett. The letters were previously quoted in several theosophical books (e.g. The Occult World by Sinnett), but not published in full. The letters were important to the movement due to their discussions on the theosophical cosmos and spiritual hierarchy. From 1939, the original letters were in the possession of the British Museum but later the British Library.

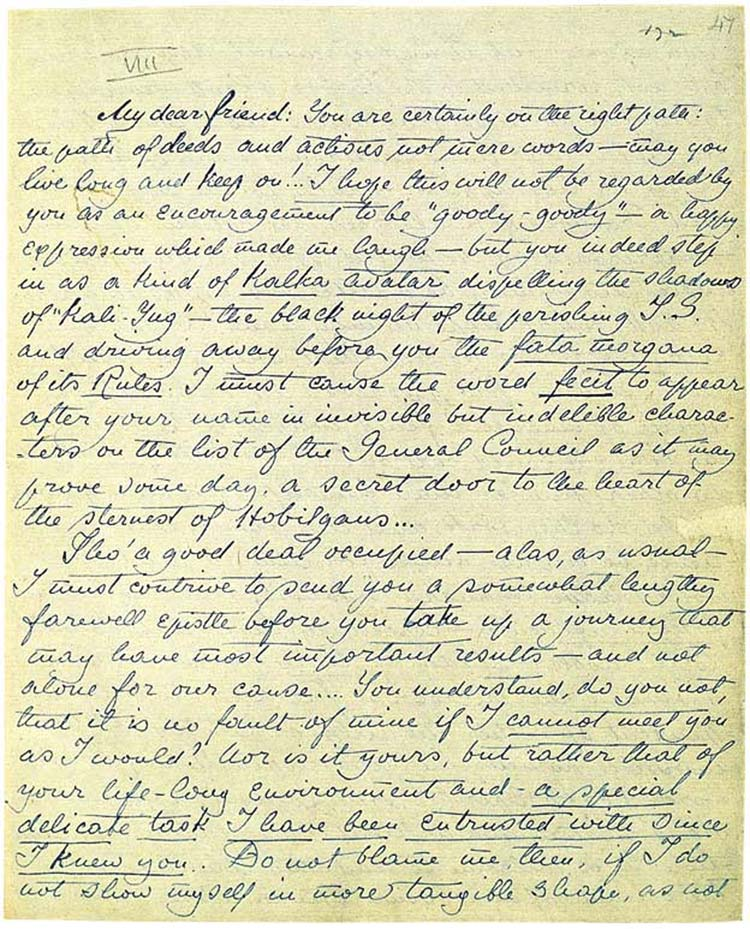
Facsimile (a fragment) of the 8th letter from the Master K.H.

The book was both praised and criticized by theosophists. Dr H. N. Stokes called the book "the most authoritative work of a theosophical nature ever made accessible to the public. It is simply transcendent in its importance."

== Criticism ==
Patterson wrote about theosophical occult phenomena, "What if these signs and wonders are proofs of something very different?... Instead of a message from beings of supernal wisdom and power, we shall have only the private thoughts of a clever but not over scrupulous woman."

A member of the SPR and a research worker of paranormal phenomena Richard Hodgson wrote in The Age:

"I was enabled while in India to secure various Mahatma documents for my own examination, and after a minute and prolonged comparison of these with Madame Blavatsky's handwriting, I have not the slightest doubt that all the documents which I thus had the opportunity of examining were, with the exception of one, written by Madame Blavatsky. The one exception, in my opinion, was unquestionably written by Mr. Damodar, one of her confederates; it is a document which Madame Coulomb asserts she saw being prepared by Mr. Damodar when she peeped through a hole — apparently made for spying purposes — in the wooden partition separating Mr. Damodar's room from the staircase. Further inquiries concerning the 'Mahatma' writing remain to be made from professional calligraphic experts in London. I may allude, however, to some specimens of the K.H. writing furnished by Mr. Sinnett for examination; the K.H. writing possessed by Mr. Sinnett is particularly important, because it is upon this that Esoteric Buddhism, with its large claims, is confessedly founded; and Mr. Netherclift, the calligraphic expert, has confidently expressed his opinion that the K.H. documents thus coming from Mr. Sinnett were undoubtedly written by Madame Blavatsky. How far the K.H. letters received by Mr. Sinnett emanated from the brain of Madame Blavatsky, how far she was assisted in their production by confederates, how much of their substance was plagiarized from other writers, are questions which closely concern the intellectual ability of Madame Blavatsky, and which lie somewhat outside the present brief sketch."

=== Modern criticism ===
Leo Klejn wrote that Blavatsky's reputation was "seriously damaged after due consideration of this occult phenomena by English psychologists". A historian of esotericism K. Paul Johnson speculates that the "Masters" that Blavatsky wrote about and produced letters from were actually idealizations of people who were her mentors.

== Bibliography ==
- Barborka G.A. The Mahatmas and Their Letters, Madras, Theosophical Pub. House, 1973. ISBN 0835670627.
- EB (1910) Blavatsky, Helena Petrovna // Encyclopædia Britannica, ed. 1910.
- Harrison, Vernon, (Ph.D.) (1997) H.P. Blavatsky and the SPR, ISBN 1-55700-119-7.
- Hodgson, Richard (1885) The Theosophical Society. Russian Intrigue or Religious Evolution? // The Age (Melbourne, Australia), // 12 September 1885.
- Jenkins, Philip (2000) Mystics and Messiahs, NYC: Oxford University Press.
- Johnson, K. Paul (1994) The Masters Revealed: Madam Blavatsky and Myth of the Great White Brotherhood Albany, New York: SUNY Press.
- Johnson, K. Paul (1995) Initiates of Theosophical Masters. Albany, New York: SUNY Press.
- Kalnitsky, Arnold (2003), The Theosophical Movement of the Nineteenth Century: The Legitimation of the Disputable and the Entrenchment of the Disreputable. University of South Africa. Dissertation: 443 pp.
- Kuhn, Alvin Boyd (1930)Theosophy: A Modern Revival of Ancient Wisdom, PhD Thesis. Whitefish, Montana: Kessinger Publishing. Chap. VI "The Mahatmas and Their Letters", pp. 146–174. ISBN 9781564591753.
- Müller, F. Max (1893) Esoteric Buddhism // The Nineteenth Century (London), May 1893.
- Patterson, George (1884) The Collapse of Koot Hoomi // The Madras Christian College Magazine, September 1884.
- Shearman, Hugh (1967) Madame Blavatsky & the Mahatma Letters. // The Theosophist, 1967.
- Washington, Peter (1995) Madame Blavatsky's baboon: a history of the mystics, mediums, and misfits who brought spiritualism to America, New York: Schocken Books.
- Андреев, А.И. (2008) Гималайское братство: теософский миф и его творцы, СПб: Изд. Санкт-Петербургского ун-та. ISBN 978-5-288-04705-3.
- Клейн, Лев Самуилович (2011) Рациональный взгляд на успехи мистики // "Здравый смысл", 2011, No. 2 (59).
- Соловьёв, Владимир Сергеевич (1890) Рецензия на книгу Е.П. Блаватской The Key to Theosophy.

== Video ==
- "The Mahatma letters". Theosophy UK and youtube.com. Archived from the original on 19 December 2021.
