= I. K. Taimni =

Professor of chemistry (1898–1978)

Iqbal Kishen Taimni
- Born: 1898; Lucknow, Uttar Pradesh, British India
- Died: 7 June 1978 (aged 79–80); Lucknow, Uttar Pradesh, India
- Citizenship: Indian
- Education: London University
- Scientific career
- Fields: Chemistry, philosophy
- Workplaces: Allahabad University, CSIR
- Thesis: (1928)

I. K. Taimni (Iqbal Kishen Taimni, 1898–1978) was a professor of chemistry at the Allahabad University in India, and an influential scholar in the fields of Yoga and Indian philosophy. He was a leader of the Theosophical Society. Taimni authored a number of books on Eastern Philosophy, including a modern interpretation of Patanjali's Yoga Sutras.

== Early life ==
Taimni was born in 1898 in Kashmiri Mohalla, Lucknow, Uttar Pradesh. His parents Prem Kishen Taimni and Biraj (née Gurtu) later shifted to Hardoi and then on to Allahabad where Prem Kishen Taimni got employment as Secretary Municipal Corporation, Allahabad. When Taimni was 11 years old he lost his mother to tuberculosis. His father never married again. The children, Iqbal Kishen and his sister Chandra (2 years younger than him), were brought up by their grandmother Bishen (née Ugra). Taimni had a distinguished academic career throughout, and was First class First student and a Gold Medalist.

Taimni married Kunwar (née Nagu) in Indore in 1922. She held a B.A. degree (earned in Benares), which was unusual for women of that time. He was selected for the Central Excise service but he declined the offer as he preferred teaching as a career and joined Allahabad University as a lecturer. Meanwhile, Kunwar Taimni enrolled for M. A. classes in history at the same university. She went to the UK in 1926 on being offered a scholarship to do a Montessori teacher training course. Taimni accompanied her and got enrolled for a PhD in London University. They returned in 1928 after Mrs. Taimni completed her Montessori Diploma course and Taimni completed his PhD in Inorganic Chemistry.

== Later career ==
On returning to India, Taimni resumed teaching at Allahabad University while his wife joined Krishna Ashram, Allahabad as a principal. It was a Montessori school for children sponsored by the Theosophical Society. Taimni retired in 1960 and thereafter worked for two years with the Council of Scientific and Industrial Research (CSIR).

Post retirement he took to writing commentaries on Theosophy and Hindu religious texts, for which he engaged a teacher to learn Sanskrit. (Note: In 1919 at Allahabad, Taimni became a member of the Theosophical Society Adyar.) All his books are published by the Theosophical Publishing House, Adyar, Chennai. Taimni also contributed occasionally to domestic and foreign journals on related matters, for example, meditation. He was awarded the Subba Row Gold Medal in 1975 for his contribution to the Theosophical literature. According to WorldCat, he has published 62 works, not counting articles. (Note: "Works: 62 works in 236 publications in 8 languages and 2,197 library holdings.")

Mr. and Mrs. Taimni were both vegetarians, and were lifelong members of the Theosophical Society, Adyar, Chennai. Mr. Taimni served for a number of years as Director of the School of the Wisdom at the International Headquarters of the Society.

Taimni's Man, God and the Universe was a work on occult and philosophical cosmology. His book, The Science of Yoga received a mixed review from Karel Werner who commented that Taimni's interpretations of the Yoga Sutras of Patanjali were based on his own kind of "personal syncretic philosophy" with elements from Samkhya, Theosophy and Vedanta. Werner concluded that although it is not a scholarly work it "is free from the usual deficiencies and incompetence of most of the popular literature propagating Yoga and can well be recommended to students as a valuable introductory reading on the subject."

== Taimni's works ==
The books

- Gayatri
- Glimpses into the Psychology of Yoga
- Man, God and the Universe
- Science and Occultism
- The Science of Yoga: The Yoga Sutras of Patanjali
- The Secret of Self-Realization
- Self Culture In The Light Of Occultism
- Self Realization Through Love
- Ultimate Reality & Realization

The articles

- "Some Interesting Aspects of Meditation"
- "Spiritual Life and Perception"

== See also ==
- Hinduism and Theosophy
