= Tallapragada Subba Row =

Indian Theosophist (1856–1890)

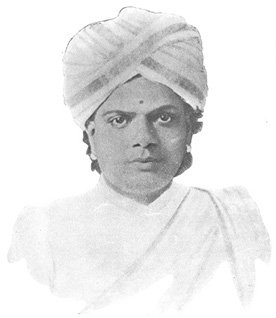
- Subba Row
- Born: Tallapragada Subba Row; July 6, 1856
- Died: June 24, 1890 (aged 33)
- Occupation: Vakil

Tallapragada Subba Row (July 6, 1856 – June 24, 1890) was an Indian Theosophist from a Hindu background and originally worked as a Vakil (Pleader) within the Indian justice system. His primary instructors in this field were Messrs. Grant and Laing, who saw to his establishment as a Vakil, a profession which became highly profitable for the time that he held it.

However, Subba Row's interest in the law paled when compared to the way he devoured philosophy, especially after an event in which he met two particular individuals. In 1882, he invited Helena Petrovna Blavatsky and Henry Steel Olcott to Madras (now Chennai), where he convinced them to make Adyar the permanent headquarters for the Theosophical Society. Prior to this meeting however, Subba Row was not known for any esoteric or mystical knowledge, even by his closest friends and parents. It was only after meeting the pair that he began to expound on metaphysics, astounding most of those who knew him.

Upon this meeting and thereafter, Subba Row became able to recite whatever passage was so requested of him from the Bhagavad Gita, Upanishads, and many other sacred texts of India. He had, apparently, never studied these things prior to the fateful meeting, and it is stated that when meeting Blavatsky and Damodar K. Mavalankar, all knowledge from his previous lives came flooding back.

== Theosophy in Adyar ==
Subba Row had initial problems with instructing non-Hindus. It was his distinct belief at the time that Hindu knowledge should remain with India, and not be extended to foreigners. In fact, even after passing over this hurdle, he was still especially private regarding his spiritual life, even to his mother and close friends. Unless the person he was speaking to had a deep understanding of mysticism, it was a fairly mute topic for him.

For many years then, Subba Row was instrumental in establishing Theosophy in India, and continued to work hard until the first draft of the Secret Doctrine was given to him. It was his initial compulsion to edit the manuscript when it had been proposed, but upon reading it, he utterly and completely refused to have anything to do with it. It was his opinion that the work contained so many mistakes that he might as well be writing a completely new book were he to edit it.

== Decline ==
In 1888, T. Subba Row resigned from the Theosophical Society along with J.N. Cook. Tensions between himself and many of the members, as well as with HPB, had grown too stressful to maintain. It was only slightly thereafter that he contracted a cutaneous disease, a sickness which manifested itself in an outbreak of boils in 1890 during his last visit to the Theosophical Society's headquarters in Madras. Eventually he would succumb to the disease that year, and died on June 24, 1890, saying that his guru had called him, and that it was time for his departure. He was cremated the morning after as per Hindu tradition.

== Memorable works ==
Among the many memorable works he left to humanity, they include his commentaries on the Bhagavad Gita, Esoteric Writings, and his Collected Writings in two volumes.

- T. Subba Row Collected Writings, Compiled and Annotated by Henk J. Spierenburg, Volume 1 en 2. Point Loma Publications, 2001, 2002. ISBN 1-889598-30-5 and ISBN 1-889598-31-3

== Articles ==
- Notes on the Bhagavad Gita
- On the Bhagavad Gita
- Philosophy of the Gita
- First Ray in Buddhism
- What Is Occultism?
- Comments on the Idyll of the White Lotus
- Occultism of Southern India
- Personal and impersonal God
- Places of Pilgrimage
- 12 signs of Zodiac

== See also ==
- Helena Blavatsky
- Damodar K. Mavalankar
