= Vladimir Trefilov =

Russian painter

Vladimir Aleksandrovich Trefilov
- Владимир Александрович Трефилов
- Born: January 16, 1949 (age 77); Izhevsk, Udmurt Autonomous Soviet Socialist Republic, USSR
- Education: Udmurt State University (Candidate of Sciences)
- Occupations: Scholar, poet, painter, yogi
- Notable work: Fundamentals of Religious Studies (in co-authorship)

Vladimir Aleksandrovich Trefilov (Russian: Влади́мир Алекса́ндрович Трефи́лов; born 1949) is a Russian scholar of religious studies, philosophy of medicine, author and lecturer. He is also known as a poet, painter and yogi.

== Biography ==
Born in Izhevsk, Udmurt Autonomous Soviet Socialist Republic, Trefilov studied History at Udmurt State University and Philosophy at Moscow State University. From 1975 he works for Izhevsk State Medical Academy. He obtained his Candidate of Sciences diploma and became in 1991 Head of the Department of Philosophy and Humanities at the Izhevsk State Medical Academy. He is author of over 50 scientific works. In 1992 he studied in United States.

Trefilov is a member of the Academic Council of the Kalashnikov Museum, in this museum he reads a cycle of public lectures Geopolitics and Military History.

Trefilov is author a book of sonnets Fireseed. (1989). In 2001 he became the head of "Udmurt Literature Union". Trefilov's pictures (in genre of "transrealism") have been displayed at 18 art exhibitions in Russia and there are in many private collections of Russia, England, and the United States. He has yoga teacher's international certificate.

=== Prophecy was fulfilled ===
External images
- Vladimir Trefilov's Prophecy
- Angel of the Bottomless Pit, 1996 (Note: Oil on canvas, 87 × 132 sm.) (Note: "They had as king over them the angel of the Abyss..." (Revelation 9:11).)
- The Star Wormwood, 1997 (Note: Oil on canvas, 92 × 132 sm.) (Note: "The name of the star is Wormwood." (Revelation 8:11).)

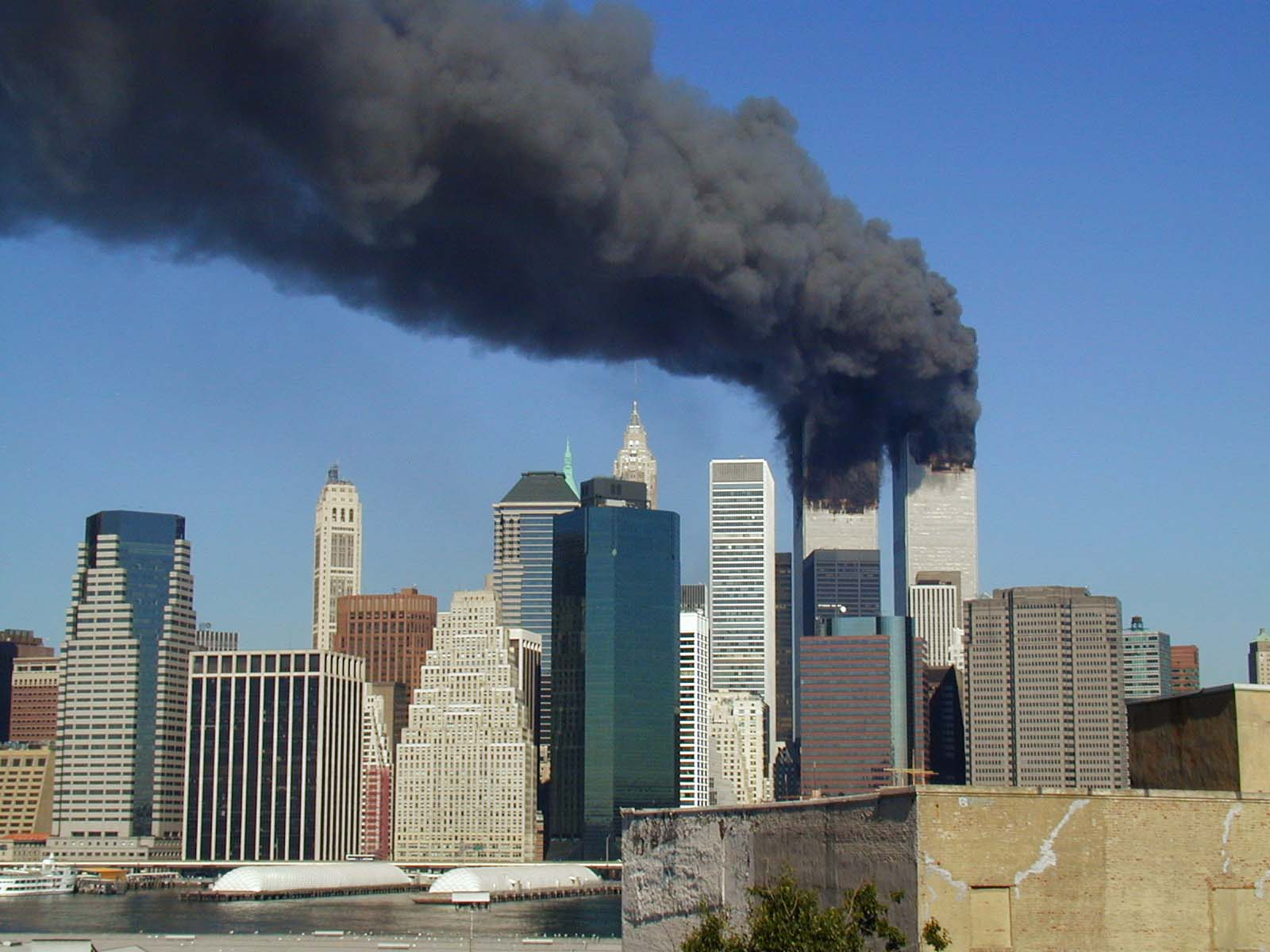
September 11 attacks

Trefilov says he studied in 1992 in United States. Someway, in the beginning of December, surveying during walk on a vicinity of Manhattan, he gazed at "two enormous buildings" and suddenly has thought of fragility of these demonstrative displays of technical progress and is unexpected for itself has presented, as they flare and fall... He says, that, probably, behind it there was a sensation of alarm concerning vulnerability of a civilization, life, a universe. It considers, that, probably, the intuition has worked. (Note: Trefilof wrote in Fundamentals of Religious Studies, "High developed man in time of dream, meditation, and trance may leave his body and to work in unphysical worlds. Here no space and temporal barriers exist.") (Note: Sarvepalli Radhakrishnan wrote, "Transmission of thought from one individual to another without the intervention of the normal communicating mechanisms is quite possible. Through concentration on the threefold modifications which all objects constantly undergo, we acquire the power to know the past, present and the future.") He has returned to "native Izhevsk and has drawn four variants of it, as now began repeat often, apocalypse." Trefilov has finished the first picture in 1996, named its Angel of the Bottomless Pit. In 1997 there was the second, under the name The Star Wormwood. September 14, 2001, newspaper День wrote that "on September 12th, 2001 Vladimir Trefilov has urgently organized display of the pictures, considering that they most precisely correspond to the today's validity." After the terrorist attacks of 11 September the fact of Trefilov's prediction evoked a wide public response and was reported both in the press and on TV.

== Publications and lectures ==
- Трефилов, Владимир (2005). "Глава xvii: Надконфессиональная синкретическая религиозная философия" [Chapter xvii: Non-denominational syncretic religious philosophy]. In Яблоков, Игорь (ed.). Основы религиоведения. Учебник [Fundamentals of Religious Studies. Textbook] (in Russian). Москва: Высшая школа. pp. 364–381. ISBN 5-06-004254-5.
- Trefilov, Vladimir (March 20, 2012). Vysotskaya, Margarita (ed.). "Dialog on the Mountain Side" (PDF). The Career Astrologer. 1 (1). Tallahassee: The Organization for Professional Astrology: 36–41. Archived from the original (PDF) on February 27, 2015.
- Медитация и творчество. (2001)
- Философия йоги и философская поэзия Шри Ауробиндо Гхоша. (2003)
- Жизненный путь и философская поэзия Шри Ауробиндо Гхоша. (2005)
- Индийская синтетическая концепция сознания и проблема эволюции сакрального искусства. (2009)
- Проблема воздействия психических вирусов на социальные процессы. (2013)
- Врач и его дело: избранные философские проблемы с позиции врача. (2014, in co-authorship)
- Лекция по интегральной йоге: структура сознания.
- Lectures about Integral yoga.
- Зерно огня: книга сонетов. (Прометей, 1989)
- Fireseed. A Book of Sonnets. (M.: Anch, 2005)
- A visit to Porfiry Ivanov. (Day and Night, May–June, 2011)
- Sri Aurobindo's Creative Career. Spiritual Poetry. (2012)
