= Damodar K. Mavalankar =

Indian Theosophist

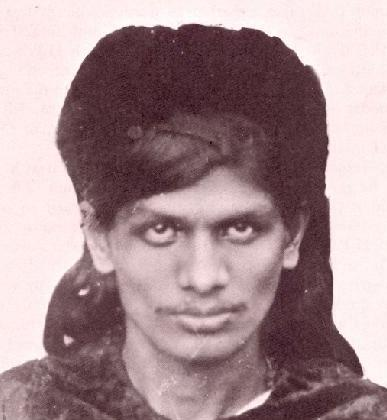
Damodar K. Mavalankar

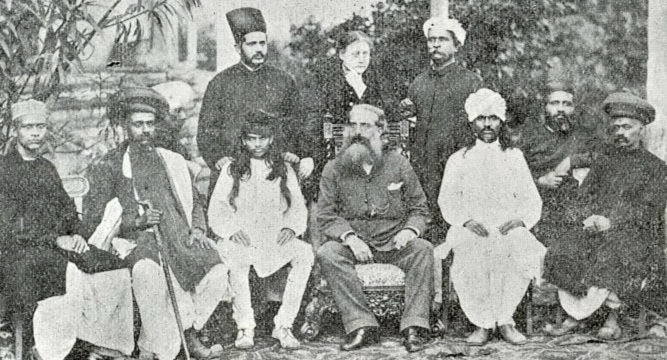
H.P. Blavatsky standing behind Henry Steel Olcott (middle seated) and Damodar Mavalankar (seated to his left). Bombay 1881

Damodar K. Mavalankar (born September 1857 in Ahmedabad - departed for the Himalayas 1885) was an Indian Theosophist.

== Biography ==
He was born in the family of the Karhâda Mahârashtra caste of Brâhmanas, a wealthy Indian family. Apart from learning the tenets of his religion by his father from an early age, he also received a very good English education.

In 1879 he met Henry Steel Olcott and H. P. Blavatsky in Bombay, after they had just established the Theosophical Society's temporary Indian headquarters there. Damodar joined the Society in 1879, giving up his caste, and in 1880, he officially became a Buddhist while in Sri Lanka, along with Henry Steel Olcott and H. P. Blavatsky. His actions displeased his family and led to conflict, due to them desiring him to return home and live with his wife who was betrothed to him in his childhood, or face the consequences of being cut out of his will. In response to this, Damodar gave up an income of 50,000 Indian rupees to provide for the future of his wife, and continued to live and work with the Theosophical founders.

He continued his work in this way until 1885, when he went to Tibet.

== See also ==
- Helena Blavatsky
- Koot Hoomi
- Morya (Theosophy)
- Tallapragada Subba Row
- Henry Steel Olcott
