= Queen Moo =

Mythical Mayan queen

Queen Moo is a mythical Mayan queen written about by Augustus Le Plongeon and his wife, Alice Dixon Le Plongeon. The Plongeons undertook the first excavation of Chichen Itza in 1875, and based their theories about Queen Moo on the murals and inscriptions that they found there. It is generally accepted that Plongeon's theories are not supported by the archaeological evidence.

== Mythology ==
Augustus Le Plongeon believed that Queen Moo was a historical Mayan queen whose life was documented in the carved bas reliefs, statues and paintings he found at Chichen Itza. He asserted that Moo and her husband, Prince Coh, also known as Chac Mool, were the inspiration for the Egyptian myth of Isis and Osiris. Queen Moo was the eldest daughter of King Canchi and Queen Zoc. She was desired by her brothers, Prince Coh and Prince Aac. She chose Coh as her mate, and Prince Aac killed him in a jealous rage. After Prince Coh's death, Queen Moo fled to seek refuge in the Land of Mu (also known as Atlantis). When she reached the location where it once was she found that the civilization had disappeared, so she made her way to Egypt.

Queen Moo's name was drawn from the Mayan word for macaw, based on the bird imagery in the Mayan representations of her figure. Le Plongeon took this as further evidence that Moo and Isis were the same figure, as Isis is often represented as a winged figure. Chacmool means jaguar paw and Plongeon believed the great cat was Prince Coh's symbol. Plongeon claimed that the Egyptian Sphinx, with its cat body and human head, was built by Queen Moo to honor her dead husband.

== Queen Moo's Talisman ==
Augustus Le Plongeon found a jade pendant during his excavations of Chichen Itza. He believed that it had belonged to Queen Moo, and he gave it to his wife, Alice Dixon Le Plongeon. The Le Plongeons believed that Alice was the reincarnation of Queen Moo and she was photographed wearing the pendant, which they referred to as Queen Moo's Talisman.

== Archaeological evidence ==
Le Plongeon discovered a well preserved mural in the Temple of the Jaguars at Chichen Itza. According to R. Tripp Evans, Le Plongeon claimed this mural was "the key to understanding the chaacmool's historical narrative." Evans explains that the meaning of the mural is still a mystery to modern scholars, but it may depict the ninth century sacking of the Mayan city, Piedras Negras. Le Plongeon believed that the mural told the story of Prince Coh, Prince Aac and Queen Moo.

One of the problematic aspects of Le Plongeon's work was his manipulation of images. R. Tripp Evans explains, "Printed images of ancient buildings, for example, often gave no visual or textual indication of the structures' locations, and isolated details are often shown without any reference to the corresponding structures from which they were photographed. Most confusing of all are Le Plongeon's doctored or "collaged" images, which he presented as unretouched field shots. His heavily redrawn photograph of a "Queen Moo" relief, taken at Uxmal, leaves little hint of the original work—while his recreation of Chichen Itza's Platform of Venus, a line drawing sandwiched between photographic images of sky and ground, is entirely invented. In works like these...Le Plongeon placed these distortions at the service of a specific narrative."

Le Plongeon identified the stone chacmool figures as Coh, the warrior prince. Le Plongeon wrote, "It is not an idol, but a true portrait of a man who has lived an earthly life. I have seen him represented in battle, in councils, and in court receptions." Mary Ellen Miller dismisses this as an "outrageous hypothesis" and counters that the figures likely represent a captive, defeated enemy. She goes on to recount the formal similarities between Le Plongeon's Chacmool and the murals and statues located throughout Central America in Tikal, Tula and various other locations. Miller claims that the figure of the chacmool has no confirmation in any manuscript, which makes deciphering their meaning difficult. However, she argues that "two Aztec chacmools found in the context of the Templo Mayor bear more iconographic data, and it is those two which may resolve the identification of the figure." Miller concludes that the aquatic symbols on the underside of the carvings, the cuaxicalli, or vessel for sacrificed hearts, held over the figure's stomach, and the "goggle-and-fangs Tlaloc mask all identify these figures as Tlaloc, the Aztec god of rain.

== Written works ==
Augustus Le Plongeon wrote three volumes on the subject of Queen Moo and Chac Mool: Queen Moo and the Egyptian Sphinx (1896), The Origin of the Egyptians, and Sacred Mysteries Among The Mayas and The Quiches, 11,500 Years Ago (1886). Le Plongeon's books were published with the aid of the Free Masons, as Le Plongeon was a Mason himself. In addition to Le Plongeon's belief that the Mayan culture was the foundation of Egyptian civilization, he also claimed that Free Masonry was invented by the Maya.

Alice Dixon Le Plongeon also wrote a volume on Queen Moo and Prince Coh; in 1902 she published an epic poem called Queen Moo's Talisman: The Fall of the Maya Empire. Alice subsequently adapted the poem into a play called The Fall of Maya: A Tragic Drama of Ancient America. These works relayed the couple's memories of their past lives as Prince Coh and Queen Moo. Alice chose to express her ideas about Queen Moo as fiction rather than attempting a scientific archaeological work as her husband had done. Alice's work was published by the Theosophical Society, with which she had a close association.

After Le Plongeon's death, Alice gave his papers to James Churchward and Churchward published several books, including The Lost Continent of Mu (1926), The Children of Mu (1931), and The Cosmic Forces of Mu (1936) which, "equaled, and often surpassed, the bizarre nature of Le Plongeon's writing." However, James Churchward relocated the location of the lost continent of Mu to the Pacific Ocean.

== Criticism ==
Augustus Le Plongeon was not a trained archaeologist, but neither were many of his peers. He did contribute a great deal of archaeological data in the form of photographs and molds of ruins and artifacts from Uxmal and Chichen Itza. However, during the late 1800s archaeology was beginning to develop more rigorous scientific standards and Le Plongeon clashed with most of his contemporaries.

Henry Chapman Mercer, an American archaeologist and Curator of American and Prehistoric Archeology in the early 1890s, stated that he had "discovered no proof for Le Plongeon's startling deductions as to the age of the Mayas and their migrations, but rather the contrary." Edward Herbert Thompson, a Mayan archaeologist and contemporary of Le Plongeon's, spent a great deal of time examining the same evidence that Le Plongeon discovered at Chichen Itza. Thompson also theorized about the possibility of a connection between the Maya, Atlantis and the Old World, but even his assessment of Le Plongeons theories was: "Don't build too much on Le Plongeon's theories or claims. Not a single point of contact between the old and new worlds before the Columbian era can be proved by monuments or facts so far found in Yucatan or adjoining provinces."

Some modern critics have focused on Le Plongeon's Romantic tendencies and the consequent impact on his theories. Brian M. Fagan, professor of Anthropology and author, opined that Le Plongeon's theories "welled up from [his] romantic subconscious." Juan Peon Contreras, director of the Museo Yucateco and a contemporary of Le Plongeon, relayed that Le Plongeon's theories were the product of "abstruse archaeological reasoning and...meditation." Evans writes that Le Plongeon's indulgence in psychic archaeology "dovetail[ed] neatly with his wife's profound interest mesmerism, seances, and the occult.

Le Plongeon came to the new world with a theory firmly in place. He had read the writings of Abbé Charles Étienne Brasseur de Bourbourg, a French writer, historian and archaeologist, about the diffusion of the Mayans to the Old World, and Le Plongeon was convinced of this theory before he even began his excavations. Le Plongeon's research suffered from his confirmation bias, and he was unable to examine the evidence objectively. Robert Brunhouse wrote in his 1973 book, In Search of the Maya, that Le Plongeon was "opinionated, haphazardly informed and reckless."

== Popular influence ==
Alison Bailey Kennedy, anthropologist and editor of the cyber culture magazine Mondo 2000, sometimes went by the pseudonym "Queen Mu".

Codex Maya by Steve Benzell is a fictional adventure novel based on the character of Monique Le Plongeon who discovers a lost trove of Mayan codices.

== See also ==
Naacal
