= Lemuria =

Hypothetical lost continent

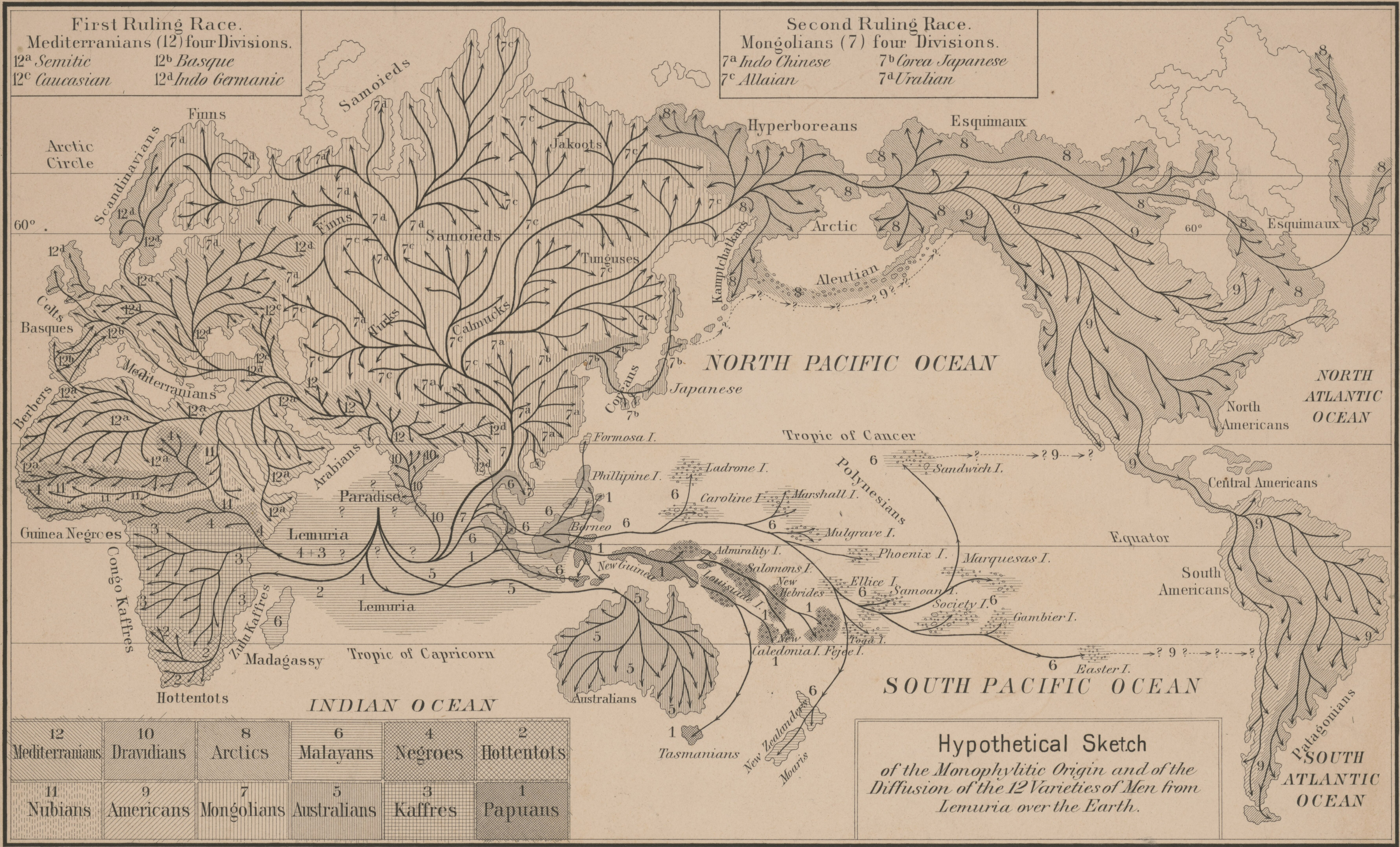
An 1876 map illustrating the supposed location of Lemuria and the hypothetical dispersal routes of the "12 varieties of men" from their alleged Lemurian origin across the globe

Lemuria (/lɪˈmjʊəriə/), or Limuria, is a hypothetical sunken continent in the Indian Ocean that was proposed in 1864 by zoologist Philip Sclater to account for the distribution of lemur fossils on Madagascar and the Indian subcontinent but not in continental Africa or the Middle East. Biologist Ernst Haeckel expanded the idea in 1870, proposing it as the ancestral home of humans. The theory was discredited with the discovery of plate tectonics and continental drift in the 20th century, but has persisted in esoteric and pseudoscientific contexts. Lemuria was reimagined in Helena Blavatsky's The Secret Doctrine (1888) as the homeland of a "third root race" of egg-laying, hermaphroditic proto-humans predating Atlantis. This reinterpretation lived on in the popular imagination, especially in relation to the Theosophist tradition or Tamil myths of the continent Kumari Kandam.

== Scientific origins ==
Lemuria was hypothesized as a land bridge, now sunken, which would account for certain discontinuities in biogeography. This idea has been rendered obsolete by modern theories of plate tectonics. Sunken continents such as Zealandia in the Pacific, and Mauritia and the Kerguelen Plateau in the Indian Ocean do exist, but no geological formation under the Indian or Pacific oceans is known that could have served as a land bridge between these continents.

=== Postulation ===
In 1864, "The Mammals of Madagascar" by zoologist and biogeographer Philip Sclater appeared in The Quarterly Journal of Science. Using a classification he referred to as lemurs, but which included related primate groups, and puzzled by the presence of their fossils in Madagascar and India, but not in Africa or the Middle East, Sclater proposed that Madagascar and India had once been part of a larger continent (he was correct in this; though in reality this was Mauritia and the supercontinent Gondwana).

the anomalies of the Mammal-fauna of Madagascar can best be explained by supposing that... a large continent occupied parts of the Atlantic and Indian Oceans... that this continent was broken up into islands, of which some have become amalgamated with... Africa, some... with what is now Asia–and that in Madagascar and the Mascarene Islands we have existing relics of this great continent, for which... I should propose the name Lemuria!

=== Parallels ===
Sclater's theory was hardly unusual for his time; "land bridges", real and imagined, fascinated several of Sclater's contemporaries. Étienne Geoffroy Saint-Hilaire, also looking at the relationship between animals in India and Madagascar, had suggested a southern continent about two decades before Sclater, but did not give it a name. The acceptance of Darwinism led scientists to seek to trace the diffusion of species from their points of evolutionary origin. Before the acceptance of continental drift, biologists frequently postulated the existence of submerged land masses to account for populations of land-based species now separated by barriers of water. Similarly, geologists tried to account for striking resemblances of rock formations on different continents. The first systematic attempt was made by Melchior Neumayr in his book Erdgeschichte in 1886. Many hypothetical submerged land bridges and continents were proposed during the 19th century to account for the present distribution of species.

=== Promulgation ===
The coat of arms of the British Indian Ocean Territory with the inscription (in Latin) "Limuria is in our charge/trust".

After gaining some acceptance within the scientific community, the concept of Lemuria began to appear in the works of other scholars. Ernst Haeckel, a Darwinian taxonomist, proposed Lemuria as an explanation for the absence of proto-human "missing links" in the fossil record. According to another source, Haeckel put forward this thesis before Sclater, without using the name "Lemuria".

=== Supersession ===
The Lemuria theory disappeared completely from conventional scientific consideration after the theories of plate tectonics and continental drift were accepted by the larger scientific community. According to the theory of plate tectonics, Madagascar and India were once part of the same landmass, thus accounting for geological resemblances, but plate movement caused India to break away millions of years ago, and move to its present location. The original landmass, Mauritia and the supercontinent Gondwana prior to that, broke apart; it predominantly did not sink beneath sea level.

== Theosophy and occultism ==
The idea of Lemuria was later incorporated into the philosophy of Theosophy and has persisted as a theme in pseudoarchaeology and discussions of lost lands. There is a vast fringe literature pertaining to Lemuria and to related concepts such as the Lemurian Fellowship and other things "Lemurian". All share a common belief that a continent existed in what is now either the Pacific Ocean or the Indian Ocean in ancient times and claim that it became submerged as a result of a geological cataclysm. An important element of the mythology of Lemuria is that it was the location of the emergence of complex knowledge systems that formed the basis for later beliefs.

The concept of Lemuria was developed in detail by James Churchward, who referred to it as Mu and identified it as a lost continent in the Pacific Ocean. Churchward appropriated this name from Augustus Le Plongeon, who had used the concept of the "Land of Mu" to refer to the legendary lost continent of Atlantis. Churchward's books included The Lost Continent of Mu, the Motherland of Men (1926), The Children of Mu (1931), The Sacred Symbols of Mu (1933), Cosmic Forces of Mu (1934), and Second Book of Cosmic Forces of Mu (1935). The relationships between Lemuria/Mu and Atlantis are discussed in detail in the book Lost Continents: The Atlantis Theme in History, Science, and Literature (1954) by L. Sprague de Camp.

=== Australia ===
Blavatsky claimed that Australia was a remnant inland region of Lemuria and that Aboriginal Australians and Aboriginal Tasmanians (which she identified as separate groups) were of Lemurian and Lemuro-Atlantean origin, after cross-breeding with animals. Her idea was subsequently developed in pseudo-histories and fiction of the white Australian popular culture of the 1890s and early 1900s, including the writings of nationalist Australian poet Bernard O'Dowd, author Rosa Campbell Praed in My Australian Girlhood, author John David Hennessey in An Australian Bush Track and George Firth Scott's novel The Last Lemurian: A Westralian Romance.

Robert Dixon suggests that the popularity of the idea of "lost races" like Lemurians and Atlanteans reflected the anxieties of colonial Australians, that "when Englishness is lost there is nothing to replace it". A. L. McCann attributes Praed's use of the Lemuria trope to an "attempt to create a lineage for white settlers without having to confront the annihilation of Indigenous people".

=== Telos Mount Shasta ===
In 1894, Frederick Spencer Oliver published A Dweller on Two Planets, an occult book which claimed that survivors from Lemuria were living in a complex of tunnels beneath the mountain of Mount Shasta in northern California. This city, known as Telos: City of Light boasted fur-lined carpeted floors and jeweled walls, all signs of opulence. Spencer also claimed that Lemurians could be seen walking the surface in white robes. In 1931, Harvey Spencer Lewis, who went by the pseudonym Wishar Spenle Cerve wrote Lemuria: the Lost Continent of the Pacific, which popularized the idea that Shasta was a repository for Lemurians.

In the 1930s, Guy Warren Ballard claimed to have been approached by Saint Germain who told him he could endow him with knowledge and wisdom. Ballard wrote and published the book Unveiled Mysteries under the alias Godfré Ray King, where Ballard claimed to be the person that Saint Germain was speaking through to get to the world. The belief in Telos has been proliferated by Ballard and his followers, as well as other religious groups like the Ascended Masters, the Great White Brotherhood, The Bridge to Freedom, The Summit Lighthouse, Church Universal and Triumphant, and Kryon.

Every year, members of these religious groups make pilgrimage to Mount Shasta, a journey that is marked by various yearly festivals and events. The Saint Germain Foundation hosts the annual "I AM COME!" Pageant, on the Life of Jesus the Christ in Mt. Shasta. The Rainbow Family hosts a Rainbow Gathering every August to commemorate the pilgrimage. These religions are often a mix of spiritual practices, based largely on native, Christian, Buddhist and Taoist traditions, synthesizing their beliefs, and excluding "negative" aspects of such religions. For example, the Saint Germain Foundation does not include Jesus' crucifixion in their teachings.

== Kumari Kandam ==
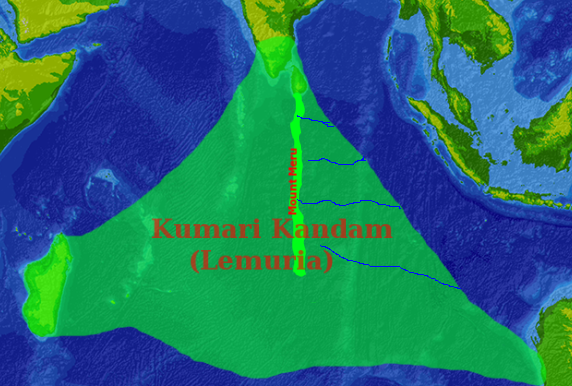
"Lemuria" in Tamil nationalist mysticist literature as Kumari Kandam, connecting Madagascar, South India, and Australia, covering most of the Indian Ocean

Some Tamil writers such as Devaneya Pavanar have associated Lemuria with Kumari Kandam, a legendary sunken landmass mentioned in the Tamil literature, claiming that it was the cradle of civilization. A Tamil commentator, Adiyarkunallar, described the dimensions that extended between the Pahrali River and the Kumari River in the Pandyan country that was taken over by the ocean later on.

== See also ==
- Mu (mythical lost continent)
- List of lost lands
- Atlantis
- Thule
