= The Lost Continent =

A lost continent is land supposedly existing during prehistory that has since disappeared.

Lost Continent or The Lost Continent may also refer to:

- Lost Continent (1951 film)
- Lost Continent (1955 film)
- The Lost Continent (1968 film)
- Atlantis, the Lost Continent
- The Lost Continent: The Story of Atlantis, an 1899 fantasy novel by C. J. Cutcliffe Hyne
- The Lost Continent: Travels in Small-Town America, a 1989 travel book by Bill Bryson
- Beyond Thirty, a 1916 science fiction novel by Edgar Rice Burroughs, retitled The Lost Continent for editions published between 1963 and 2001
- Lost Continents, a 1954 book by L. Sprague de Camp
- "Lost Continent", a 2008 short story by Greg Egan
- The Lost Continent, an area at Islands of Adventure theme park in Orlando, Florida

== See also ==
- The Last Continent, a novel by Terry Pratchett
