= Lost Continents =

Book by Lyon Sprague de Camp

Lost Continents: The Atlantis Theme in History, Science, and Literature
- Dust-jacket for Lost Continents
- Author: L. Sprague de Camp
- Cover artist: L. Robert Tschirky and Ric Binkley
- Language: English
- Subject: Atlantis
- Publisher: Gnome Press
- Publication date: 1954
- Publication place: United States
- Media type: Print (Hardback)
- Pages: 362 pp

Lost Continents: The Atlantis Theme in History, Science, and Literature is a study by L. Sprague de Camp that provides a detailed examination of theories and speculations on Atlantis and other lost lands, including the scientific arguments against their existence. It is one of his most popular works. It was written in 1948 and first published serially in the magazine Other Worlds Science Fiction in 1952–1953; portions also appeared as articles in Astounding Science Fiction, Galaxy Science Fiction, Natural History Magazine, and the Toronto Star. It was first published in book form by Gnome Press in 1954; an updated edition was published by Dover Publications in 1970. De Camp revised the work both for its first book publication and for the updated edition.

== Overview ==
L. Sprague de Camp enjoyed debunking doubtful history and pseudoscientific claims. The work provides a detailed examination of theories and speculations on Atlantis and other lost lands, including the scientific arguments against their existence, and how they have been continued, developed and imitated by later theorists, speculators, scientific enquirers, enthusiasts, occultists, quacks, and fantasists throughout history. Major speculative locales as Atlantis, Mu, and Lemuria are covered in depth, with the origins of lesser-known ones such as Thule, Hyperborea, and Rutas also treated. The work shows how the misinterpretation of Mayan writings created the Mu myth, and how the name Lemuria originated from the geological hypothesis about a land bridge between India and South Africa. The book goes into modern usage of the concept in speculative fiction, as well as the various attempts to discover the "real" Atlantis.

Lost Continents by L. Sprague de Camp, Dover Publications, 1970

The 1970 edition was updated to reflect the rehabilitation of Alfred Wegener's continental drift theory and investigation of the ancient volcanic eruption of the Aegean island of Thera. This eruption is considered by many who think that Plato's account of Atlantis' destruction had an underlying historical basis

== Importance ==
De Camp's work is still one of the most reliable sources on the lost continent theme. Lost continents or ancient civilizations sunk by a deluge are a common theme in the scriptures of doctrines of many modern pseudoreligions or cults. Well-known instances include James Churchward's books on Mu, the Theosophical portrayals of Hyperborea, Lemuria and Atlantis, and even the Nazi mythologizing about Thule. As authors of these materials tend not to state (or do mis-state) their sources, works like that of de Camp are quite useful to anyone interested in objective information.

== Critical reception ==
Reviewer Groff Conklin described the original edition as "a monument of scholarship [and] a richly documented and entertaining survey of how crazy the crackpots can get." Boucher and McComas praised it as "a marvelously and terrifying history of the human will-to-believe, even in the face of all factual evidence."
