= George Firth Scott =

Scottish Australian journalist and fiction writer

George Henry Firth Scott, (c. 1862 – 3 January 1935) was a Scottish-born Australian journalist and writer, generally known as G. Firth Scott. He was the son of George Firth Scott, Land Commissioner and Emma Elizabeth (née Barnes). He was born about 1862 at Golspie, County Sutherland, Scotland.

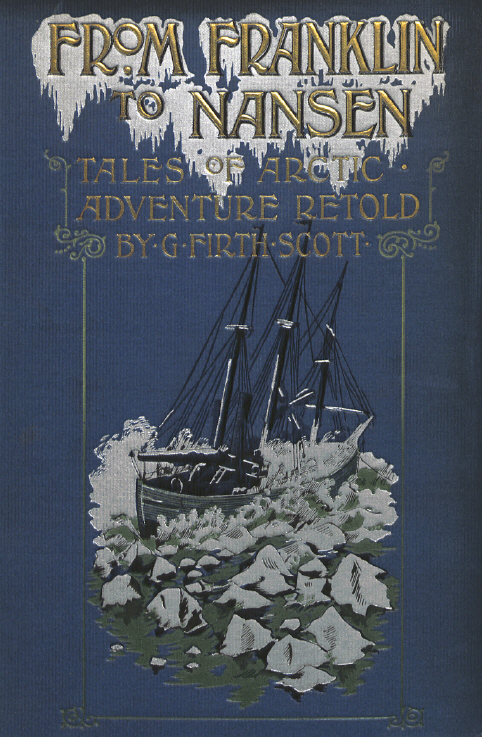
From Franklin to Nansen: Tales of Arctic Adventure (1899)

He came to Australia and worked as a journalist for newspapers, including The Hobart Mercury and the Sydney Daily Telegraph and also contributed stories to magazines including Belgravia.

On 4 October 1889 he married Ailleen Murphy at St. Stephen's Cathedral, Brisbane. Ailleen was the eldest daughter of John and Hannah (née Smith) Murphy. John Murphy, who died in 1883, was police-magistrate at Roma, Queensland and had, on a number of occasions, been Mayor of Ipswich, Queensland.

Ailleen Scott gave birth to two children in Australia after which the Scotts went to Great Britain and settled there permanently, where Ailleen gave birth to four more children. Following Aileen's death in 1919, in Surrey, England, George married Miss Gladys Tatham in London on 20 February 1920.

George Firth Scott died on 3 January 1935 at Surrey, England. He was survived by his second wife, Gladys.

== Works ==
Scott is best known for his novel The Last Lemurian: A Westralian Romance (1898), however he wrote many other novels and non-fiction works. His fiction titles include:

- The Track of Midnight (1897)
- At Friendly Point (1898)
- Colonial Born: A Tale of the Queensland Bush (1900)
- The Twillford Mystery (1903)
- Possessed (1911)
- The Rider of Waroona (1912).

His non-fiction titles include:

- The Romance of Australian Exploring (1899)
- From Franklin to Nansen: Tales of Arctic Adventure (1899)
- Britain's Austral Empire: Portraits of Statesmen (1901)
- The Romance of Polar Exploration (1906)
- Daring Deeds of Polar Explorers (1921)
- The Reeling World (1931).

The Last Lemurian has been described as a "lost race romance" and has been compared with other works by Australian novelists including Ernest Favenc's The Secret of the Australian Desert (1896) and John David Hennessey's An Australian Bush Track (1896). The Last Lemurian includes pygmies, a bunyip-monster, a phosphorescent Yellow Queen (who has lived for thousands of years) and reincarnation. In the novel, the remains of the fabled Lemuria were discovered somewhere in the Australian desert.
