= Naacal =

Ancient people and civilization

Naacal is the name of an ancient people and civilization first claimed to have existed by British-American pseudoscientific archaeologist Augustus Le Plongeon and subsequently by British occult writer James Churchward.

== Augustus Le Plongeon's description of the Naacal ==
The first recorded use of the term "Naacal" is contained in Augustus Le Plongeon's work from 1896, "Queen Moo and the Egyptian Sphinx." From pages xxiii - xxiv of the preface:

"Perhaps also will be felt the necessity of recovering the libraries of the Maya sages (hidden about the beginning of the Christian era to save them from destruction at the hands of the devastating hordes that invaded their country in those times), and to learn from their contents the wisdom of those ancient philosophers, of which that preserved in the books of the Brahmins is but the reflection. That wisdom was no doubt brought to India, and from there carried to Babylon and Egypt in very remote ages by those Maya adepts (Naacal—'the exalted'), who, starting from the land of their birth as missionaries of religion and civilization, went to Burmah, where they became known as Nagas, established themselves in the Dekkan, whence they carried their civilizing work all over the earth."

According to Augustus Le Plongeon, the Naacals were the missionaries of Mayan religion and civilization. Le Plongeon advocated that the original, great civilization was in Central America, which contrasts with Churchward's view.

== James Churchward's description of the Naacal ==
The next known published use of the word occurred in 1926 when James Churchward used the term in his book, The Lost Continent of Mu, Motherland of Man.

According to James Churchward, the Naacal were the people and civilization of the lost continent of Mu, as well as the name of their language.

According to Churchward, the population of the Naacal civilization was as high as 64 million. Their civilization, which flourished 50,000 years ago, was technologically more advanced than the civilization of Churchward's own time (late 19th to early 20th century), and the ancient civilizations of India, Babylon, Persia, Egypt, and the Mayas were merely the decayed remnants of Naacal colonies.

Churchward claimed to have gained his knowledge of the Naacals after befriending an Indian priest, who taught him to read the ancient dead language of the Naacals, spoken by only three people in all of India. The priest disclosed the existence of several ancient tablets, written by the Naacals, and Churchward gained access to these records after overcoming the priest's initial reluctance. His knowledge remained incomplete, as the available tablets were mere fragments of a larger text, but Churchward claimed to have found verification and further information in the records of other ancient peoples.

Churchward claimed that the ancient Egyptian sun god Ra originated with the Naacals; he claimed that "Rah" was the word which the Naacals used for "sun" as well as for their god and rulers.

== Mention in "The Life and Teaching of the Masters of the Far East" Vol. 2 (1927) ==
In volume 2 of "The Life and Teaching of the Masters of the Far East," Baird T. Spalding makes this remark about the 'Naacals':

"The teachings that Buddha received came from the same source as did those of Osiris but in a different way. The teachings that Buddha contacted came from the Motherland direct to Burma, brought there by the Naacals. Osiris' teachings came direct to him, as his forefathers lived in the Motherland and when he was a young man he had gone to the Motherland to study."

David Bruton, Spalding's biographer revealed in "Baird T. Spalding As I Knew Him" (IEP, 1956) that Spalding's books were a magical autobiography and essentially fiction. Therefore, the inference that the Naacals themselves are a fiction or modern myth is strengthened.

== Critiques ==
At the time of Churchward's publication, his work and sources were discredited. Historian Curtis Wilgus from George Washington University noted that Churchward's books read like 'the strangest of fiction', with 'imagination' mixed with 'mystic fanaticism' and 'not the slightest erudition'.

Engineer and writer L. Sprague de Camp dismissed the idea of the Naacal in an article written in 1946 on the subject of lost civilisations.

== In modern fiction ==
- In the H. P. Lovecraft story "Through the Gates of the Silver Key", the occultist Harley Warren is said to be an expert linguist of the Naacal language.
- In the Malleus Monstrorum Volume I Monsters of the Mythos, a Call of Cthulhu (role-playing game) bestiary, the language of the serpent people is said to be derived from Naacal.
- In the anime series RahXephon, Ernst Von Bähbem, a Mulian, is sometimes called the "Brother of Naacal" and was the founder of the Naacal Company, which eventually became the Bähbem Foundation.
- In the Visual novel Ever 17: The Out of Infinity, Coco uses a supposed directive in the Naacal Tablet to call Takeshi father, and Tsugumi mother.
- In Andre Norton's Central Asia novels, two main characters are Naacals. She identifies Draupadi from the Mahabharata and the Hindu deity Ganesha as Naacal survivors who advise humanity. She describes two warring factions among the Naacals who have different aims and pursuits. Her Naacal civilization existed as islands in an inner Asian sea which eventually perished.
- In "The Dweller in the Tomb," Lin Carter describes engraved pieces of black jade called the Zanthu Tablets, which are written in Naacal.
- In the Italian comics named "Martin Mystère", by Alfredo Castelli, Sergio Bonelli Editore, the Archeologist M.M. discovers the ancient reigns of "Atlantide" and "Mu", the second of which was inhabited by the Naacals.
- In the cartoon series The Mysterious Cities of Gold, Naacals were said to be sages and advisors to the ancient kings of Mu.
