= Mu (mythical lost continent) =

- 'Lost Continent of Mu Motherland of Men' location
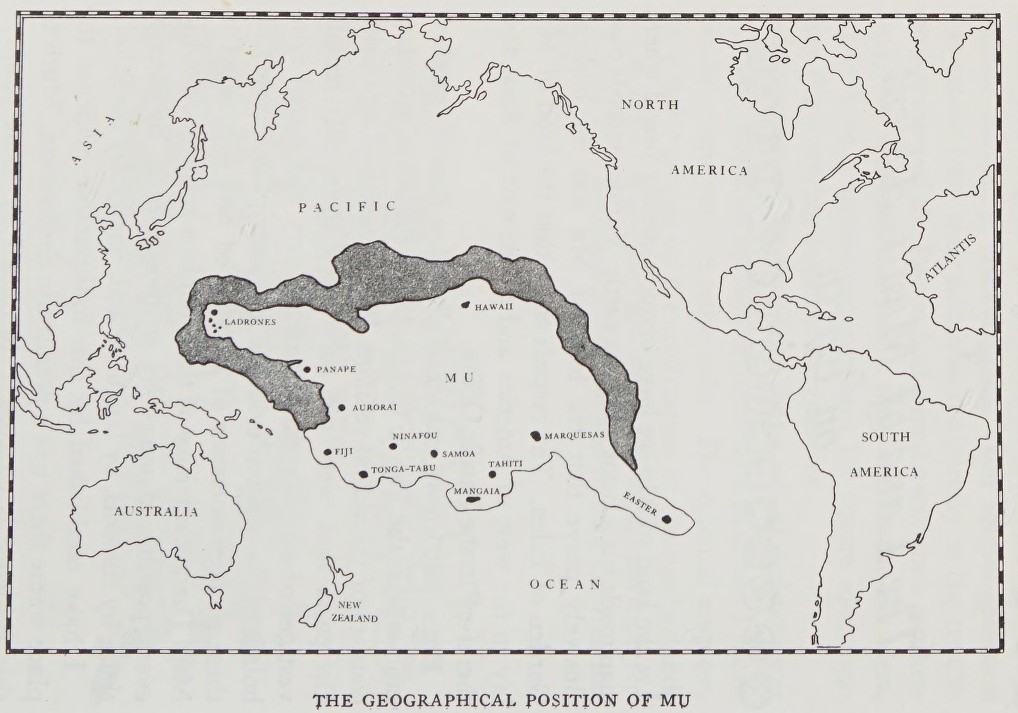
- Map of Mu by James Churchward
- Created by: Augustus Le Plongeon
- Genre: Pseudoscience

In-universe information
- Type: Hypothetical lost continent
- Location: Pacific Ocean

Mu is a lost continent introduced by Augustus Le Plongeon, who identified the "Land of Mu" with Atlantis. The name was subsequently identified with the hypothetical land of Lemuria by James Churchward, who asserted that it was located in the Pacific Ocean before its destruction. The place of Mu in both pseudoscience and fantasy fiction is discussed in detail in Lost Continents (1954, 1970) by L. Sprague de Camp.

The existence of Mu and the lost continent of Atlantis has no factual basis, and is physically impossible, as a continent can neither sink nor be destroyed in the short period of time asserted in the legends, folklore and literature about these places.

== History of the concept ==
=== Augustus Le Plongeon ===
The mythical idea of the "Land of Mu" first appeared in the works of the British-American antiquarian Augustus Le Plongeon, after his investigations of the Maya ruins in Yucatán. He claimed that he had translated the first copies of the Popol Vuh, the sacred book of the K'iche', from the ancient Mayan using Spanish. He claimed the civilization of Yucatán was older than those of Greece and Egypt, and told the story of an even older continent.

Le Plongeon got the name "Mu" from Charles Étienne Brasseur de Bourbourg, who, in 1864, mistranslated what was then called the Troano Codex (now called "Madrid Codex") using the de Landa alphabet. Brasseur believed that a word which he read as Mu referred to a land that had been submerged by a catastrophe. Le Plongeon identified this lost land with Atlantis and, following Ignatius Donnelly in Atlantis: The Antediluvian World (1882), identified it as a continent that had once existed in the Atlantic Ocean:

In our journey westward across the Atlantic we shall pass in sight of that spot where once existed the pride and life of the ocean, the Land of Mu, which, at the epoch that we have been considering, had not yet been visited by the wrath of Human, that lord of volcanic fires to whose fury it afterward fell a victim. The description of that land given to Solon by Sonchis, priest at Sais; its destruction by earthquakes, and submergence, recorded by Plato in his Timaeus, have been told and retold so many times that it is useless to encumber these pages with a repetition of it.

=== James Churchward ===
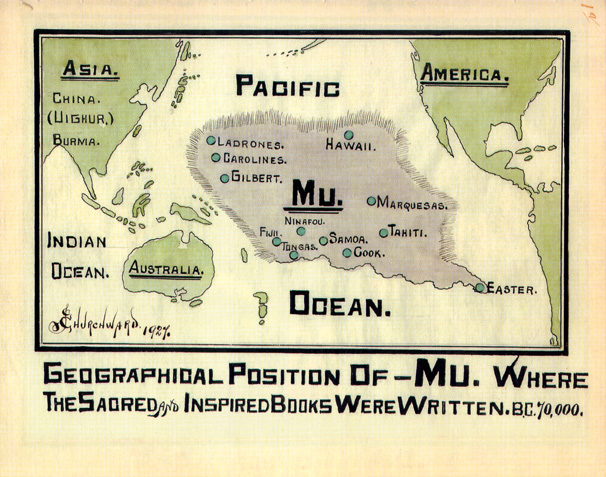
Map of the mythical lost continent of Mu in 'Books of the Golden Age' by James Churchward published in 1927.

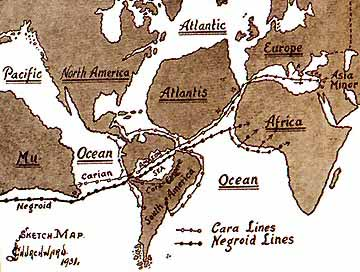
Churchward's map showing how he thought Mu refugees spread out after the cataclysm through South America, along the shores of Atlantis, and into Africa.

Mu, as an alternative name for a lost Pacific Ocean continent previously identified as the hypothetical Lemuria (the supposed place of origin for lemurs), was later popularised by James Churchward in a series of books, beginning with Lost Continent of Mu, the Motherland of Man (1926), re-edited later as The Lost Continent Mu (1931). Other popular books in the series are The Children of Mu (1931) and The Sacred Symbols of Mu (1933).

Churchward claimed that "more than fifty years ago", while he was a soldier in India, he befriended a high-ranking temple priest who showed him a set of ancient "sunburnt" clay tablets, supposedly in a long-lost "Naga-Maya language" which only two other people in India could read. Churchward convinced the priest to teach him the dead language and decipher the tablets by promising to restore and store the tablets, for Churchward was an expert in preserving ancient artifacts. The tablets were written in either Burma or in the lost continent of Mu itself, according to the high priest. Having mastered the language himself, Churchward found out that they originated from "the place where [man] first appeared—Mu". The 1931 edition states that "all matter of science in this work are based on translations of two sets of ancient tablets": the clay tablets he read in India, and a collection of 2,500 stone tablets that had been uncovered by William Niven in Mexico.

The tablets begin with the creation of Earth, Mu, and the superior human civilization Naacal by the seven commands of the seven superlative intellects of the seven-headed serpent Narayana. This creation story dismisses the theory of evolution. Churchward gave a vivid description of Mu as the home of an advanced civilization, the Naacal, which flourished between 50,000 and 12,000 years ago, was dominated by a "Melanated/Black race", and was "superior in many respects to our own". At the time of its demise, about 12,000 years ago, Mu had 64 million inhabitants and seven major cities, and colonies on the other continents. The 64 million inhabitants were separated into ten tribes that followed one government and one religion.

Churchward claimed that the landmass of Mu was located in the Pacific Ocean, and stretched east–west from the Marianas to Easter Island, and north–south from Hawaii to Mangaia. According to Churchward the continent was supposedly 5,000 miles from east to west and over 3,000 miles from north to south, which is larger than South America. The continent was believed to be flat with massive plains, vast rivers, rolling hills, large bays, and estuaries. He claimed that according to the creation myth he read in the Indian tablets, Mu had been lifted above sea level by the expansion of underground volcanic gases. Eventually Mu "was completely obliterated in almost a single night": after a series of earthquakes and volcanic eruptions, "the broken land fell into that great abyss of fire" and was covered by "fifty millions of square miles of water". Churchward claimed the reasoning for the continent's destruction in one night was because the main mineral on the island was granite and was honeycombed to create huge shallow chambers and cavities filled with highly explosive gases. Once the chambers were empty after the explosion, they collapsed on themselves, causing the island to crumble and sink.

Churchward claimed that Mu was the common origin of the great civilizations of Egypt, Greece, Central America, India, Burma and others, including Easter Island, and was in particular the source of ancient megalithic architecture. As evidence for his claims, he pointed to symbols from throughout the world, in which he saw common themes of birds, the relation of the Earth and the sky, and especially the Sun. Churchward claimed that the king of Mu was named Ra and he related this to the Egyptian god of the sun, Ra, and the Rapa Nui word for Sun, ra'a. He claimed to have found symbols of the Sun in "Egypt, Babylonia, Peru and all ancient lands and countries – it was a universal symbol".

As additional evidence for his claims, Churchward looked to the Holy Bible and found through his own translations that Moses was trained by the Naacal brotherhood in Egypt. Churchward makes references to the Ramayana epic, a religious text of Hindu attributed to sage and historian Valmiki. Valmiki mentions the Naacals as "coming to Burma from the land of their birth in the East", that is, in the direction of the Pacific Ocean.

Churchward attributed all megalithic art in Polynesia to the people of Mu. He claimed that symbols of the sun are found "depicted on stones of Polynesian ruins", such as the stone hats (pukao) on top of the giant moai statues of Easter Island. Citing W. J. Johnson, Churchward describes the cylindrical hats as "spheres" that "seem to show red in the distance", and asserts that they "represent the Sun as Ra". He also incorrectly claimed that some of them are made of "red sandstone", which does not exist on the island. The platforms on which the statues rest (ahu) are described by Churchward as being "platform-like accumulations of cut and dressed stone", which were supposedly left in their current positions "awaiting shipment to some other part of the continent for the building of temples and palaces". He also cites the pillars "erected by the Māori of New Zealand" as an example of this lost civilization's handiwork. In Churchward's view, the present-day Polynesians are not descendants of the dominant members of the lost civilization of Mu, responsible for these great works, but are instead descendants of survivors of the cataclysm that adopted "the first cannibalism and savagery" in the world.

=== John Newbrough ===
In the 1882 book Oahspe: A New Bible, John Newbrough included a map of the Earth in antediluvian times (i.e. prior to the great flood of biblical record) where an unknown continent is located in the Northern Pacific. Newbrough called this continent Pan. People often link both Pan and Mu as the same mythological continent since both are claimed to be located in the Pacific. Newbrough continues to claim that the unknown continent disappeared 24,000 years ago, but will soon rise from the Pacific and will be inhabited by the Kosmon race.

=== Louis Jacolliot ===
Louis Jacolliot was a French attorney, judge, and occultist who specialized in the translation of Sanskrit. He wrote about the land of the Rutas, a lost land that ancient sources claimed was in the Indian Ocean but which he placed in the Pacific Ocean and associated with Atlantis stories in Histoire des Vierges. Les Peuples et les continents disparus (1874). He amplified upon this in Occult Science in India (1875, English translation 1884). He has been identified as a contributor to Rosicrucianism.

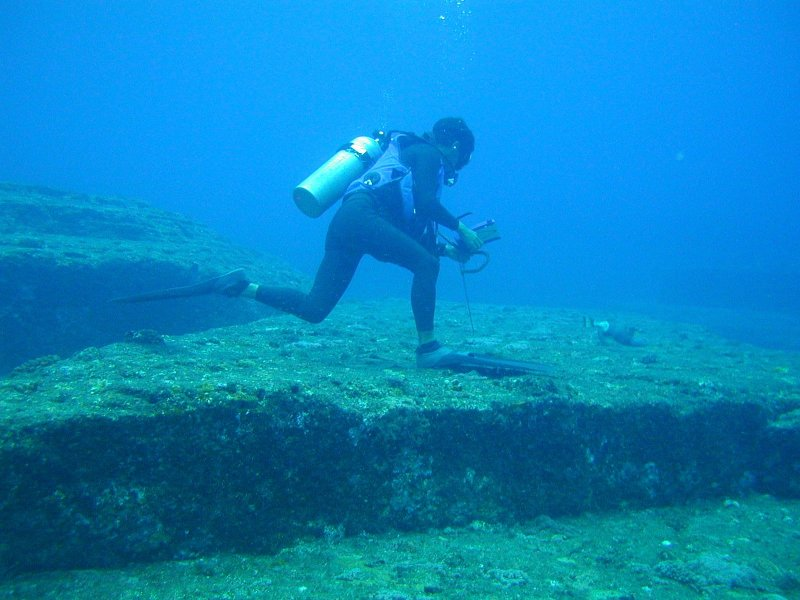
Underwater structures claimed to be remnants of Mu, near Yonaguni, Japan

=== Modern claims ===
In the 1930s, Mustafa Kemal Atatürk, founder of the Turkish Republic, was interested in Churchward's work and considered Mu as a possible location of the original homeland of the Turks. On the other hand, according to some views, Atatürk's interest in the continent of Mu did not go beyond examining the claims. Despite Tahsin Mayatepek's proposals, he did not see the need to establish a Department of Mu Language at Ankara University's School of Language and History – Geography. The relationship between Atatürk and the continent of Mu has been exaggerated to attract interest in the books written about the continent of Mu.

Masaaki Kimura has suggested that certain underwater features located off the coast of Yonaguni Island, Japan (popularly known as the Yonaguni Monument), are ruins of Mu.

== Criticism ==
=== Geological arguments ===
Modern geological knowledge rules out "lost continents" of any significant size. According to the theory of plate tectonics, which has been extensively confirmed since the 1970s, the Earth's crust consists of lighter "sial" rocks (continental crust rich in aluminium silicates) that float on heavier "sima" rocks (oceanic crust richer in magnesium silicates). The sial is generally absent in the ocean floor where the crust is a few kilometers thick, while the continents are huge solid blocks tens of kilometers thick. Since continents float on the sima much like icebergs float on water, a continent cannot simply "sink" under the ocean.

It is true that continental drift and seafloor spreading can change the shape and position of continents and occasionally break a continent into two or more pieces (as happened to Pangaea). However, these are very slow processes that occur in geological time scales (hundreds of millions of years). Over the scale of history (tens of thousands of years), the sima under the continental crust can be considered solid, and the continents are basically anchored on it. It is almost certain that the continents and ocean floors have retained their present position and shape for the whole span of human existence.

There is also no conceivable event that could have "destroyed" a continent, since its huge mass of sial rocks would have to end up somewhere—and there is no trace of it at the bottom of the oceans. The Pacific Ocean islands are not part of a submerged landmass but rather the tips of isolated volcanoes.

Map of Easter Island showing locations of the ahu and moai

This is the case, in particular, of Easter Island, which is a recent volcanic peak surrounded by deep ocean (3,000 m deep at 30 km off the island). After visiting the island in the 1930s, Alfred Métraux observed that the moai platforms are concentrated along the current coast of the island, which implies that the island's shape has changed little since they were built. Moreover, the "Triumphal Road" that Pierre Loti had reported ran from the island to the submerged lands below, is actually a natural lava flow. Furthermore, while Churchward was correct in his claim that the island has no sandstone or sedimentary rocks, the point is irrelevant because the pukao are all made of native volcanic scoria.

=== Archaeological evidence ===
Easter Island was first settled around 300 CE and the pukao on the moai are regarded as having ceremonial or traditional headdresses.

== In popular culture ==
=== Literature/print ===
- H. P. Lovecraft featured the lost continent in his revision of Hazel Heald's short story "Out of the Aeons" (1935). Mu appears in numerous Cthulhu Mythos stories, including many written by Lin Carter in his Xothic legend cycle.
- The 1970 Mu Revealed is a humorous spoof by Raymond Buckland purporting to describe the long lost civilization of Muror, located on the legendary lost continent of Mu. The book was written under the pseudonym "Tony Earll", an anagram of "not really". The book claimed to present a translation of a diary compiled by a boy called Kland found and translated by an archaeologist named "Reedson Hurdlop", an anagram of "Rudolph Rednose".
- Mû, la cité perdue by Hugo Pratt.

=== Television shows ===
- The cartoon The Mysterious Cities of Gold repeatedly mentions the civilization of Mu (also called Hiva in its first season) as a technologically superior civilization that disappeared following a war with the rival continent of Atlantis, leaving behind ruins and artifacts all throughout the world. The "Naacals" are presented as scientists and advisors to the Kings of Mu.
- The 1980 anime Muu no Hakugei (The White Whale of Mu) focuses on the return of Atlantis after their loss in an ancient war against Mu. They return in modern day to take over the world for a second time. Five warriors are chosen to represent Mu in the new battle against the Atlantean threat.

== See also ==
- Agartha
- Atlantis
- Doggerland
- Kumari Kandam
- Lost city
- Lost lands
- Mauritia (microcontinent)
- Zealandia
