= Lost lands =

Islands or continents supposedly existing during prehistory, having since disappeared

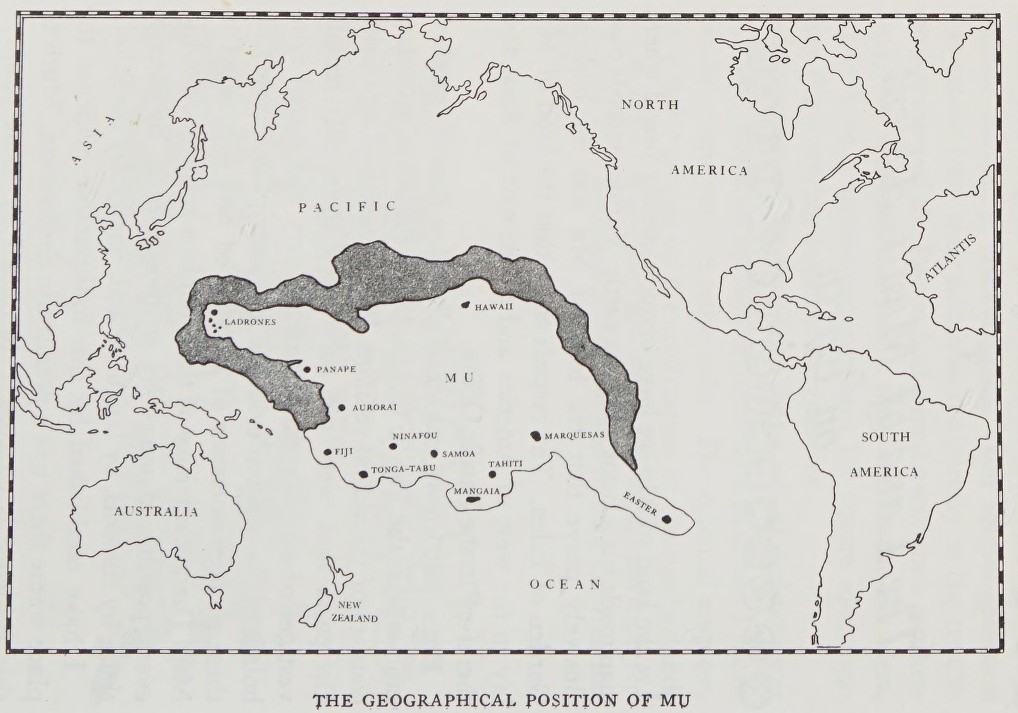
Map of Mu by James Churchward

Lost lands are islands or continents believed by some to have existed during prehistory, but have since disappeared as a result of catastrophic geological phenomena.

Legends of lost lands often originated as scholarly or scientific theories, only to be picked up by writers and individuals outside the academy. Occult and New Age writers have made use of lost lands, as have subaltern peoples. Phantom islands, as opposed to lost lands, are land masses formerly believed by cartographers to exist in the current historical age, but have been discredited as a result of expanding geographic knowledge. The classification of lost lands as continents, islands, or other regions is in some cases subjective; for example, Atlantis is variously described as either a "lost island" or a "lost continent". Lost land theories may originate in mythology or philosophy, or in scholarly or scientific theories, such as catastrophic theories of geology.

With the development of plate tectonic simulation software, new lost land has been discovered and confirmed by the scientific community (like Greater Adria in 2019).

== Submerged lands ==
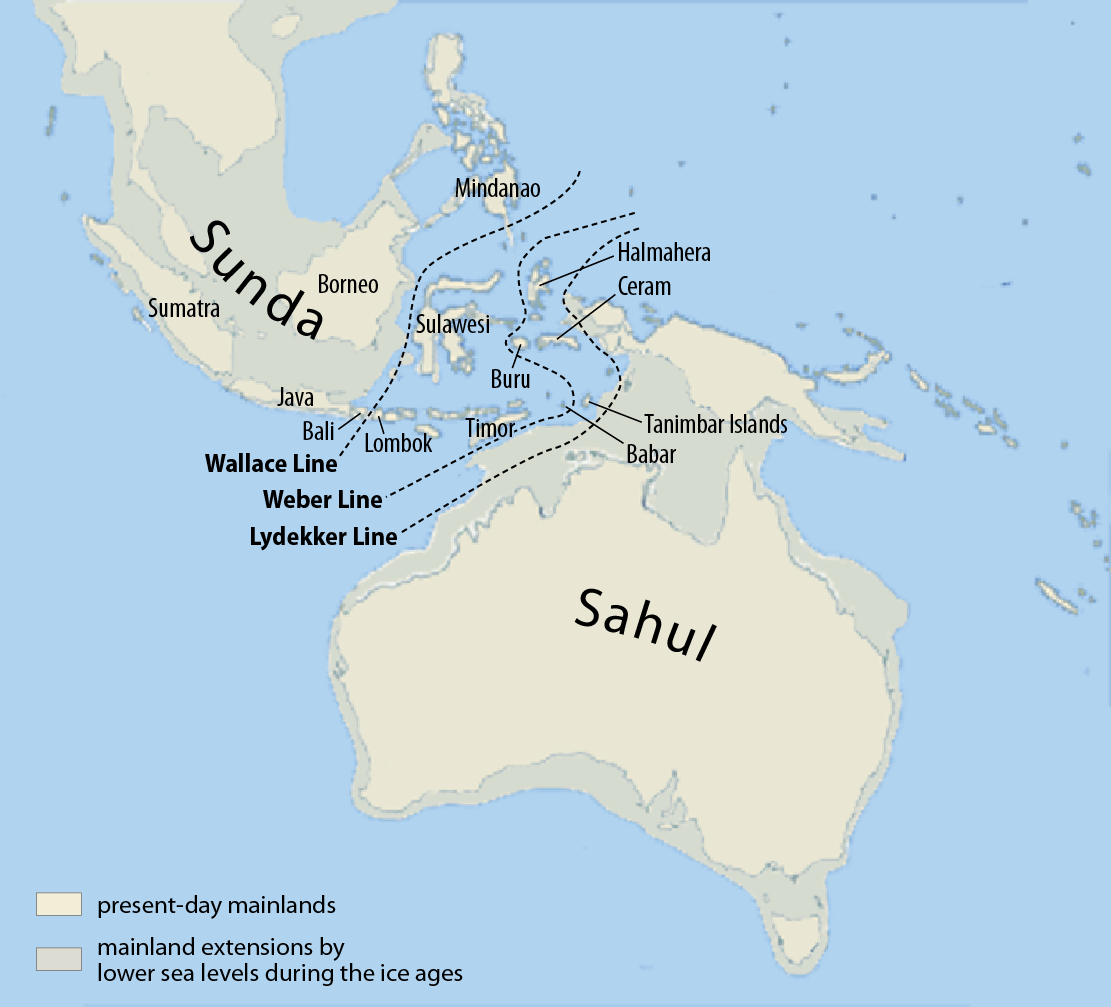
The Sahul Shelf and the Sunda Shelf during the Last Glacial Maximum and today. The area in between is called "Wallacea".

Map showing hypothetical extent of Doggerland, c. 8,000 BC

Although the existence of lost continents in the above sense is mythical (aside from Zealandia and Greater Adria), there were many places on Earth that were once dry land, but submerged after the end of the ice age around 10,000 BCE due to rising sea levels, and possibly were the basis for Neolithic and Bronze Age flood myths. Some were lost due to coastal erosion or volcanic eruptions. An (incomplete) list follows:

- A large island in the Mediterranean Sea, of which Malta is the only part not now submerged.
- Balkanatolia, a sunken land in the Mediterranean Sea.
- Beringia, connecting Asia and North America.
- Doggerland, the bed of the North Sea, which once connected Great Britain to Continental Europe before being inundated by rising sea levels during the Holocene
- Ferdinandea, a submerged volcanic island in the Mediterranean Sea that has appeared at least four times in the past.
- Kerguelen Plateau, a partially-submerged micro-continent of which part, the Kerguelen Islands, is not now submerged. Other parts are now 1–2 kilometres (0.62–1.2 miles) below sea level.
- Maui Nui, once a large island of the Hawaii archipelago; several major islands represent residual high ground of Maui Nui.
- Sundaland, the now submerged Sunda Shelf.
- The Viking-Bergen Banks are submerged hills in the North Sea which formed Viking-Bergen Island during the Last Glacial Period and possibly the northernmost point of Doggerland.

=== Lost continents ===
- Greater Adria, a continent connecting between Italy and North Africa.
- Zealandia, a scientifically accepted continent that is now 94% submerged under the Pacific Ocean, surrounding the areas of New Zealand and New Caledonia.

== Mythical and pseudoscientific lost lands ==
Atlantis, Lemuria, and Mu are among the most widely known examples of supposed “lost lands,” a term applied to places that have vanished or disappeared due to catastrophic events. Although each lost land originated from different contexts, their many interpretations are shaped by pseudoscientific, occult, and New Age ideas. Despite the lack of concrete evidence, these lost lands are still prominent cultural influences and popular in discussions about ancient mysteries and possible vanished civilizations of the past. These lost lands continue to foster speculation, imagination, reinterpretation, theory, and debate about the possibility of their existence.

=== Atlantis ===
The fictitious story of Atlantis originates from two dialogues, Timaeus and Critias, created by the Greek philosopher Plato in the 4th century BCE. In these writings, the island of Atlantis is described by Critias as a rich, successful, and powerful empire that grew morally corrupt over time. Ultimately, Atlantis collapses through war, defeated by Athens, and "all of Atlantis was destroyed in a tremendous cataclysm of earthquakes and floods”. Most scholars agree that the story of Atlantis was never meant to be true history but more so an entertaining story that conveys moral lessons.

Throughout history, the idea of Atlantis was reinterpreted many times, especially through Ignatius Donnelly, who is considered the modern “father of the nineteenth-century Atlantis revival”. In 1882, he published a book titled Atlantis: The Antediluvian World, which discussed that Atlantis was the source of origin for Egyptian, Mesoamerican, and Mediterranean cultures. Donnelly sought to prove his diffusionist Atlantis claim by drawing archaeological comparisons between the civilizations, though these comparisons were widely rejected by mainstream archaeology and scholars. However, his ideas laid the foundation for later pseudoscientific interpretations of Atlantis.

In the 20th and 21st centuries, Atlantis has emerged as a central subject in pseudoarcheology, where it is often associated with global cultural diffusion, ancient aliens, or lost advanced technologies. Modern fringe theories deviate from Plato’s writings entirely and relocate Atlantis to different places across the world like the Mid-Atlantic, the Caribbean, or Antarctica. Atlantis also plays a significant role in popular culture, influencing movies, literature, television shows, and other media.

Despite alternative interpretations and influences Atlantis still has today, the scholarly consensus remains the same that no geological or archaeological evidence indicates the true existence of Atlantis. Because of this, Atlantis is regarded as a mythical land attributed to the mind and imagination of the Greek philosopher, Plato.

=== Lemuria ===
Lemuria, as a lost land, was first presented by the British zoologist Philip Lutley Sclater in The Quarterly Journal of Science in April 1864. Sclater proposed that the existence of a now-submerged landmass linking Madagascar and India would explain the geographic distribution of lemurs. He was in favor of this theory because he found their distribution to be difficult to account for through the knowledge of species migration that was present at the time. Others like Sclater also used the idea of land bridges to explain continental species distribution before the idea of plate tectonics, a theory proposed by Alfred Wegener, became accepted as modern geology developed in the mid-20th century. Sclater’s hypothesis about Lemuria was then abandoned as plate tectonics now provided a clear explanation for continental drift and the distribution of lemurs that Sclater was studying.

Despite this scientific consensus, the idea of Lemuria was reimagined by Helena Blavatsky and the Theosophical Society in the late 19th century, transforming it into a mythical lost continent that related to their esoteric practices. They saw Lemuria as a precursor to Atlantis that was home to prehistoric “root races” who possessed psychic power and advanced spiritual qualities. According to Blavatsky, the sinking of Lemuria was followed by the rise of Atlantis, which became the dwelling of the fourth “root race”. With the rise of spiritualism in the 19th century, Lemuria was reinterpreted as not a geological land bridge but a place of theosophy and occultism concepts.

In today’s modern culture, Lemuria is kept alive by fringe theories, speculative fiction, occultism, New Age beliefs, and alternative archaeology theories. However, claims about the existence of Lemuria continue to remain unsupported by scientists due to the lack of physical and geological evidence of the lost land.

=== Mu ===
The lost land of Mu originated in the late 19th and early 20th centuries, mainly through Augustus Le Plongeon and James Churchward’s works. After misinterpreting Maya inscriptions, Le Plongeon proposed that the Maya civilization originated from a lost continent in the Atlantic called Mu, a name which he got from Charles Etienne Brasseur de Bourbourg’s mistranslation of the Madrid Codex. James Churchward expanded on this idea in his work The Lost Continent of Mu (1926) and claimed to have translated ancient Naacal tablets that described Mu as the center of an immense Pacific civilization that predated all cultures.

Churchward’s narrative described an advanced Naacal race that supposedly spread civilization throughout the world and was the origin of influence for ancient civilizations such as Egypt, India, and Central America. These ideas reflect early 20th-century hyperdiffusionism, which is the pseudoarchaeology theory that all major world civilizations share a single common origin.

No archaeological, geological, or historical evidence supports the existence of the continent of Mu. The idea of Mu originated from mistranslated and misinterpreted texts and speculative reconstructions rather than from concrete evidence and verifiable data. The claim of Mu as the source for other civilizations is rejected by archaeologists as there is evidence for their independent origins supported by archaeological, linguistic, and genetic evidence.

Despite its lack of credibility and scientific evidence, Mu is still a recurring theme in New Age literature, pseudoscientific discussions about ancient civilizations, and the media. Those who believe in Mu often draw on Churchward’s descriptions and link them to advanced ancient technology, forgotten spiritual knowledge, or other diffusionist theories. In New Age belief systems, Mu is often grouped with Atlantis and Lemuria and portrayed as a triad of mythical “lost lands” that fall into esoteric and occult beliefs. Because the lost land of Mu is based on an imaginative construct of speculative interpretations rather than concrete evidence presented by archaeology or science, Mu is regarded as a pseudoscientific lost land.

== Other mythological lands ==
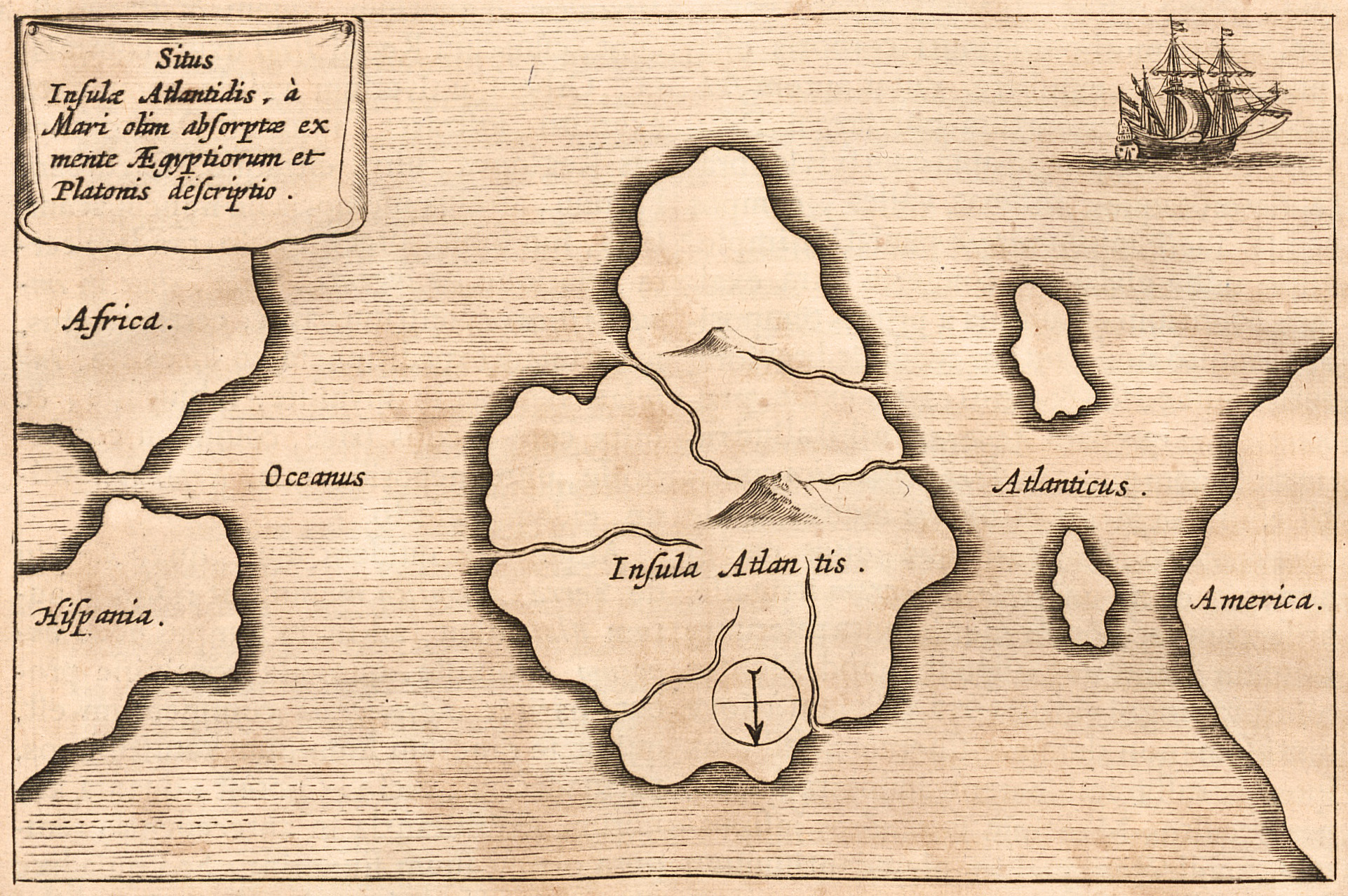
Plato's Atlantis described in Timaeus and Critias

- Agartha, in the Hollow Earth.
- Avalon, the mythical lost land or island in Arthurian, Cornish and Welsh legend.
- Buyan, an island with the ability to appear and disappear in Slavic mythology.
- Island of Brasil, also known as Hy-Brasil, west of Ireland.
- Cantre'r Gwaelod, in Welsh legend, the ancient sunken realm said to have occupied a tract of fertile land lying between Ramsey Island and Bardsey Island in what is now Cardigan Bay to the west of Wales.
- Dvārakā, the submerged city of Lord Krishna
- Iram of the Pillars, a lost city, country or area mentioned in the Qur'an.
- Tegnue, calcareous rock formations in the northern Adriatic Sea, were historically believed to be the ruins of cities that had sunk beneath the sea during an ancient flood.
- Atlantis of the Sands, also known as Ubar, somewhere in Arabia.
- Jomsborg and Vineta, legendary cities on the south coast of the Baltic Sea supposed to have been submerged in the Middle Ages.
- Kitezh, a legendary underwater city located in Russia, populated by spiritual people.
- Kumari Kandam, a mythical lost continent with an ancient Tamil civilization in the Indian Ocean
- Llys Helig Welsh legends regarding the local rock formations conceal the palace of Prince Helig ap Glanawg, said to be part of a larger drowned kingdom near Penmaenmawr, Wales.
- Lyonesse in Arthurian literature: it was the home of Tristan and is usually associated with the Isles of Scilly, Cornwall (an area inundated by the sea c. 2500 BC). The tale parallels the Welsh and particularly Breton legendary lost lands.
- Shangri-La, a fictitious valley in Tibet, the idea of which may have been inspired by the myth of Shambhala
- Quivira and Cibola, also known as the Seven Cities of Gold. These were suspected somewhere in America by the Conquistadors.
- El Dorado, mythic city of gold.
- Ys, a mythical drowned city in Brittany, similar to other Celtic lost lands in Welsh and Cornish tradition. Most versions of the legend place the city in the Baie de Douarnenez.

== Figures in literature and philosophy ==
The following individuals are known for having written on the subject of lost lands (either as fiction, hypothesis, or supposed fact):

- H.P. Blavatsky
- Edgar Rice Burroughs (The Land That Time Forgot, Tarzan and the Jewels of Opar, At the Earth's Core)
- James Churchward
- Henry Corbin (Malakut or Hurqalya)
- Ignatius L. Donnelly
- Burak Eldem
- Warren Ellis
- Philip José Farmer
- H. Rider Haggard
- Robert E. Howard (Hyborian Age)
- Édouard Lalo (Le roi d'Ys)
- H. P. Lovecraft often invoked the names of lost lands of his own invention, a practice that subsequently gave birth to the Cthulhu Mythos.
- Geoffrey of Monmouth first mention of Avalon in his Historia Regum Britanniae
- Nicholas Monsarrat (The Time Before This, set in northern Canada)
- Plato
- Augustus Le Plongeon
- Zecharia Sitchin
- J. R. R. Tolkien (his Númenor legend is partly based on Atlantis. Beleriand, the main theatre of action in The Silmarillion is sunk at the end of the story cycle. Both Númenor and Beleriand are referenced in his most famous work: The Lord of the Rings.)
- Jack Vance (Lyonesse Trilogy)
- Samael Aun Weor
- Umberto Eco (The Island of the Day Before)
- Jules Verne (The Mysterious Island)

Notable past (purple) and current (orange) land bridges on a bathymetric equirectangular projection centred on 45° E

== See also ==
- Flood myth
- Lost city
- Lost world
- Past sea level
- Phantom island
- Vanishing island
- Terra Australis
- Tidal island
