= Chacmool =

Mesoamerican sculpture

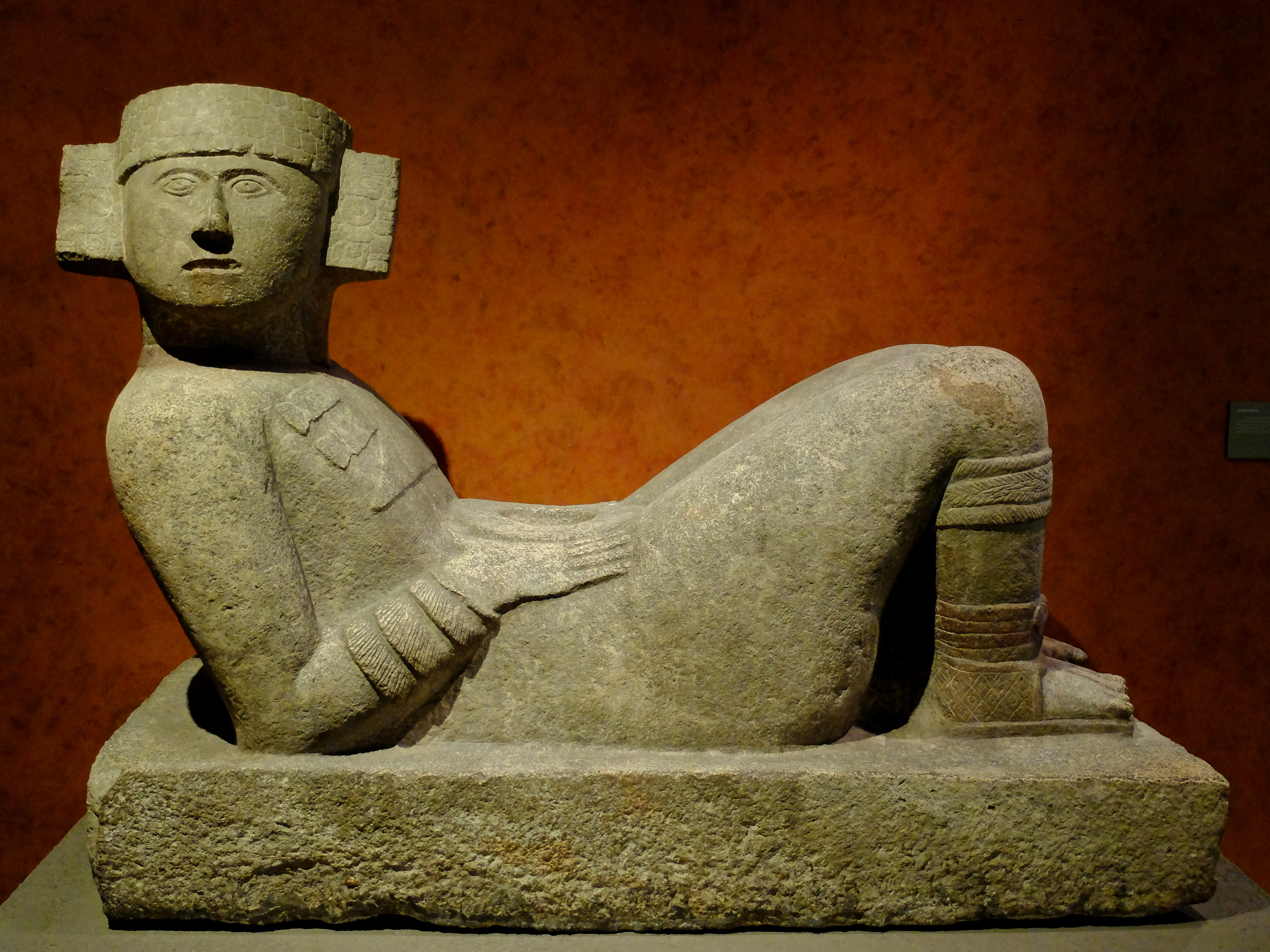
Maya chacmool from Chichen Itza, excavated by Le Plongeon in 1875, now displayed at the National Museum of Anthropology in Mexico City

A chacmool (also spelled chac-mool or Chac Mool) is a form of pre-Columbian Mesoamerican sculpture depicting a reclining figure with its head facing 90 degrees from the front, supporting itself on its elbows and supporting a bowl or a disk upon its stomach. These figures possibly symbolised slain warriors carrying offerings to the gods; the bowl upon the chest was used to hold sacrificial offerings, including pulque, tamales, tortillas, tobacco, turkeys, feathers, and incense. In Aztec examples, the receptacle is a cuauhxicalli (a stone bowl to receive sacrificed human hearts). Chacmools were often associated with sacrificial stones or thrones. The chacmool form of sculpture first appeared around the 9th century AD in the Valley of Mexico and the northern Yucatán Peninsula.

Aztec chacmools bore water imagery and were associated with Tlaloc, the rain god. Their symbolism placed them on the frontier between the physical and supernatural realms, as intermediaries with the gods.

== Form ==
The chacmool is a distinctive form of Mesoamerican sculpture representing a reclining figure with its head facing 90 degrees from the front, leaning on its elbows and supporting a bowl or a disk upon its chest. There is great variation among individual chacmools, with some possessing heads that are right-facing and others left-facing, and some with the heads facing upwards; some examples have movable heads. The figure may be lying on its back or on its side and the abdomen can be sunken below the level of the chest and knees or at the same level. Some chacmools were raised upon rectangular bases. Some of the figures are richly attired whilst others are almost naked.

The chacmools of Chichen Itza and Tula depict young men with warrior attributes, while the chacmools of Michoacán depict elderly men with wrinkled faces and erect penises. A chacmool from Guácimo, Costa Rica, combines human and jaguar features and grips a bowl. The face of the figure looks upwards and the bowl was apparently used to grind foodstuffs.

A wide variety of materials were used to sculpt chacmools, including limestone and hard metamorphic and igneous rock types. Other materials employed include ceramic and cement.

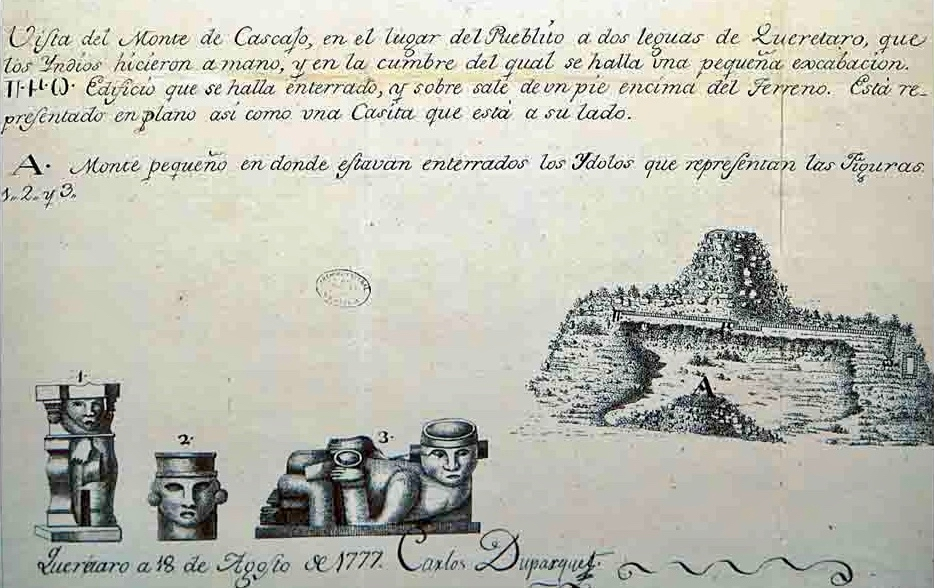
Illustration including example of what would later be called a "Chac Mool" found in El Cerrito, Querétaro in 1777

== Discovery and naming ==
The ancient name for these types of sculptures is unknown. The term chacmool is derived from the name "Chaacmol," which Augustus Le Plongeon in 1875 gave to a sculpture that he and his wife Alice Dixon Le Plongeon excavated within the Temple of the Eagles and Jaguars at Chichén Itzá in 1875; he translated Chaacmol from Yucatecan Mayan as the "paw swift like thunder." Le Plongeon believed the statue, which he had found buried beneath the Platform of the Eagles and the Jaguars, depicted a former ruler of Chichen Itza. Le Plongeon's sponsor, Stephen Salisbury of Worcester, Massachusetts, published Le Plongeon's find, but revised the spelling to "Chac-Mool."

Le Plongeon sought permission from Mexico's president to display the statue at the Centennial Exhibition in Philadelphia in 1876, a request that was denied. In 1877 the Yucatecan government seized the statue and brought it to Mérida. Weeks later Yucatán turned over the statue to the federal government, which brought it to Mexico City to the National Museum of Anthropology. Museum worker Jesús Sanchez realised that the Chichen Itza sculpture was stylistically similar to two sculptures from central Mexico and the wide occurrence of the form within Mesoamerica was first recognised. The 19th century discovery of chacmools in both central Mexico and the Yucatán Peninsula helped to promote the idea of a Toltec empire although the chacmool sculptures may have originated in the Maya region.

Although the name chacmool was inappropriately applied, it has become a useful label to link stylistically similar sculptures from different regions and periods without imposing a unified interpretation. Besides these sites, the sculpture was also found in Michoacán, where it is called Uaxanoti (The Seated One) in the Purépecha language.

== Distribution ==
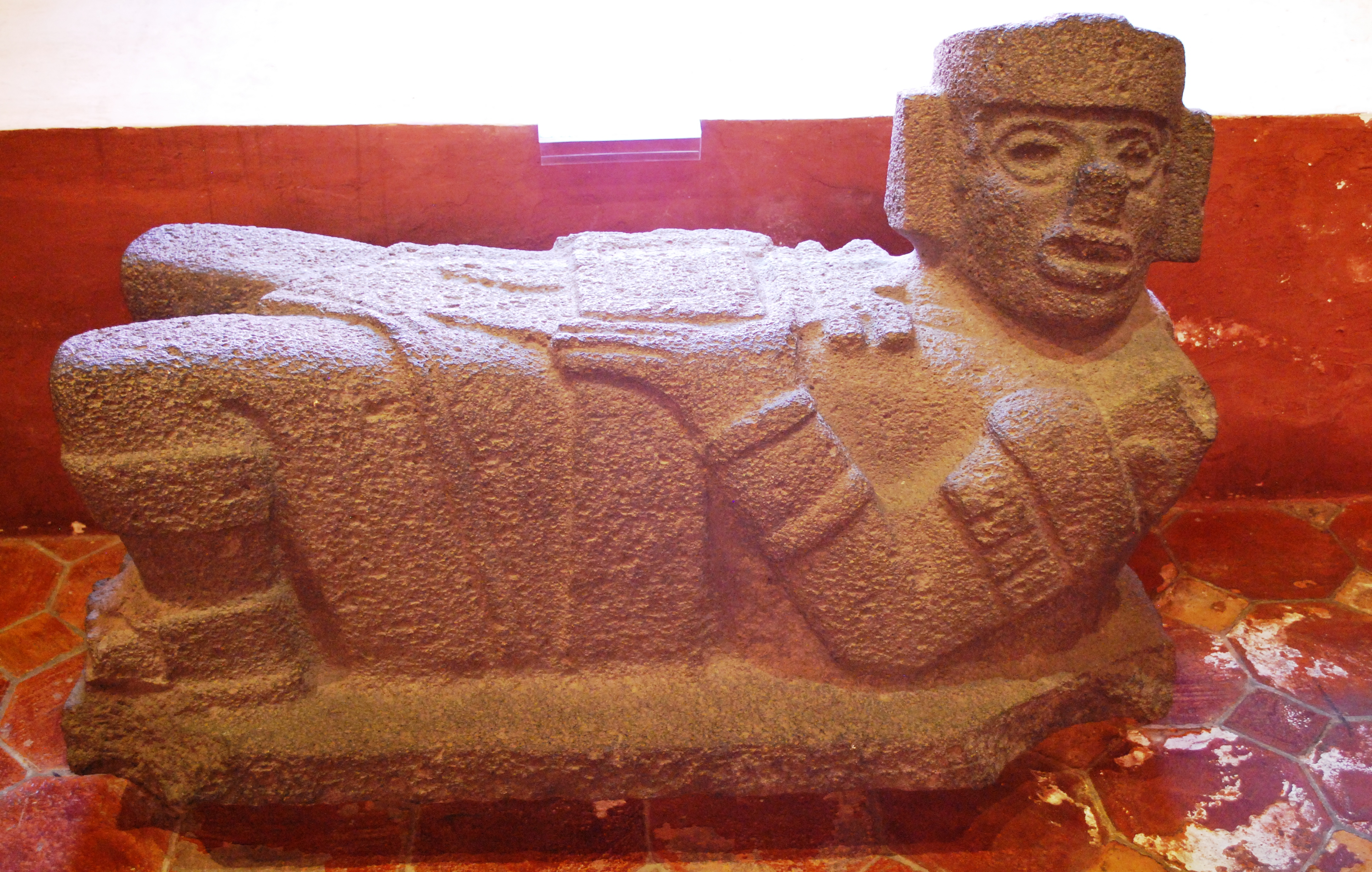
A Chacmool in the Regional Museum of Tlaxcala

Examples of chacmool sculptures have been found widely across Mesoamerica from Michoacán in Mexico down to El Salvador. The earliest examples date from the Terminal Classic period of Mesoamerican chronology (c. AD 800–900). Examples are known from the Postclassic Aztec capital of Tenochtitlan, from the central Mexican city of Tula and from the Maya city of Chichen Itza in the Yucatán Peninsula. Fourteen chacmools are known from Chichen Itza and twelve from Tula. The chacmool from the palace at Tula is dated to the Early Postclassic (c. AD 900–1200). Further examples are known from Acolman, Cempoala, Michoacán, Querétaro and Tlaxcala.

In Chichen Itza, only five of the fourteen chacmools were securely confirmed in architectural contexts, those in the Castillo, the Chacmool Temple, the North Colonnade, the Temple of the Little Tables and the Temple of the Warriors. The rest were found interred in or near important structures. The five that were found in secure architectural contexts were all placed within entrance areas near a ritual seat or throne. The chacmools in Tula also had an association with thrones or raised seating platforms, either in front of the throne or at the entrance to a chamber containing a throne.

Two chacmools have been recovered that were associated with the Great Temple of Tenochtitlan, the Aztec capital. The first was discovered in 1943, on the junction of Venustiano Carranza and Pino Suarez, about two blocks south of the temple itself. The second chacmool was excavated in the sacred precinct. This is the only fully polychrome chacmool that has been recovered anywhere; it had an open mouth and exposed teeth and stood in front of the temple of Tlaloc, the Aztec rain god; its sculpted bowl probably received heart and blood sacrifices. This latter sculpture is by far the older of the two.

Chacmools have been reported as far south as the Maya city of Quiriguá, near the Guatemalan border with Honduras. The Quiriguá chacmool most likely dated to the Postclassic period and is stylistically similar to those of Tula rather than Chichen Itza. Two chacmools were reported from Tazumal, a Maya site in western El Salvador. A chacmool was excavated at Las Mercedes in Guácimo, Costa Rica.

== Dating and origin ==
The oldest chacmool ever discovered was the Terminal Classic. The form was unknown in such important Mesoamerican cities as Teotihuacan and Tikal. After the first appearance of the form, it was rapidly disseminated throughout Mesoamerica, spreading as far south as Costa Rica. Although a central Mexican origin is generally assumed, there are no antecedents pre-dating the Toltecs and the form is not present in central Mexican codices.

The positioning and context of the chacmool form do have antecedents in Classic Maya art and art historian Mary Ellen Miller has argued that the chacmool developed out of Classic period Maya imagery. No central Mexican chacmool has been found that clearly predates the Chichen Itza examples. However, Tula and Chichen Itza may have developed simultaneously with rapid communication of the chacmool form from one city to the other.

The wider variety of chacmool forms at Chichen Itza has also been used to support the development of the form there; no two possess identical form, dress and proportions. At Tula the chacmools have a standardised form with little variation in position or proportions. Miller has proposed that the chacmool developed out of Classic Maya iconography and underwent a transition into three dimensional sculpture at Chichen Itza, perhaps spurred by the influence of central Mexican sculptural forms. A chacmool from Costa Rica was dated by the excavators to approximately AD 1000.

== Aztec Chacmool ==
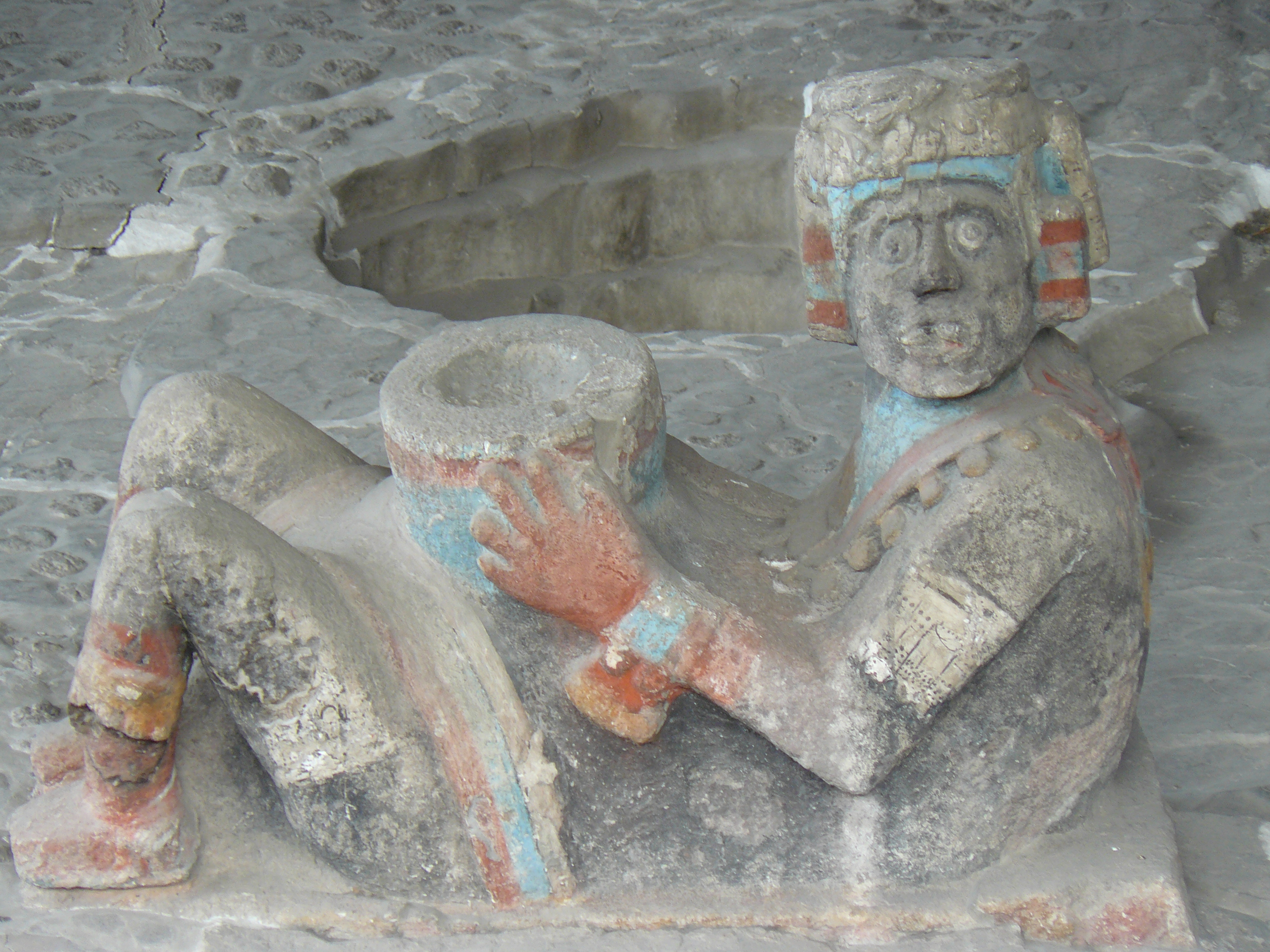
An Aztec chacmool from the Templo Mayor. This example includes the original polychrome pigment, which helped archaeologists identify its iconography ties to Tlaloc.

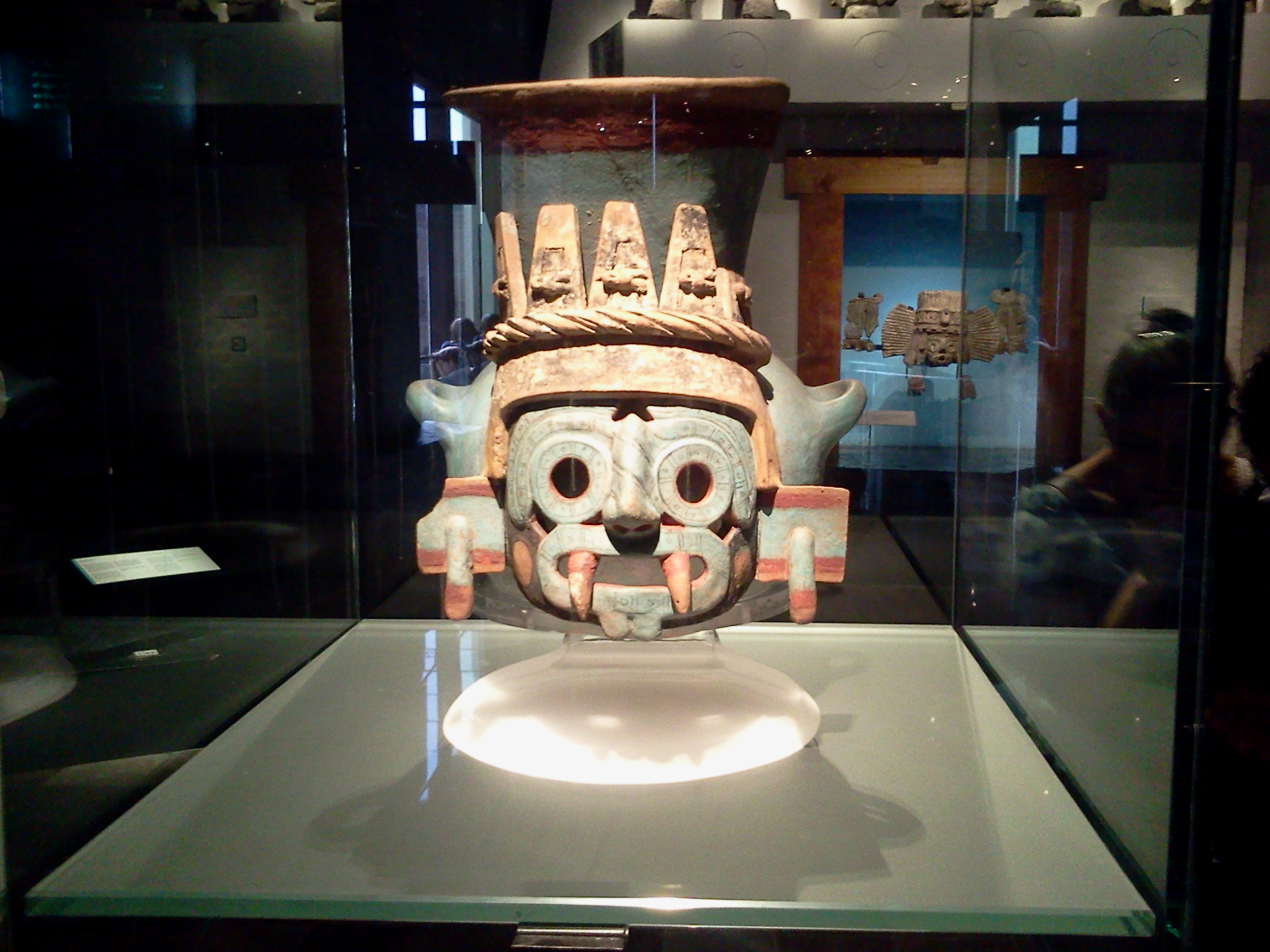
A Tlaloc vessel made by the Aztecs, which is currently located at the Museo del Templo Mayor in Mexico City, Mexico

During the 1930 excavation of Templo Mayor, the only fully polychrome chacmool to be found at that site was in its original context on the top level of the Tlaloc side (the rain god) of the temple. The position of this chacmool statue mirrored the position of the sacrificial stone on the Huitzilopochtli (the Aztecs' patron deity, associated with war) side of the temple. Archaeologist Eduardo Matos Moctezuma posits that this mirroring confirms his interpretation that the chacmool acted as an "intermediary between the priest and the god, a divine messenger," in the same way the sacrificial stone on the Huitzilopochtli side does.

The pigment that remained on this chacmool sculpture was crucial to its identification, as it does not contain any sculpted iconography or symbols associated with the rain god Tlaloc. Archaeologists were able to create a reconstruction of the sculpture's original colors, which they then compared to pictographic representations of Tlaloc. This comparison confirmed that the polychrome chacmool discovered at Tlaloc's side of the Templo Mayor was a representation of the deity itself. Characteristics such as the "chia circles on the cheeks, the circular gold pectoral medallion, and the color combination of the petticoat, as well as the black skin, the red hands and feet, and the white headdress and bangles" echo the iconography of other depictions of Tlaloc. Art historians Leonardo Lopez Lujan and Giacomo Chiari argue that this "confirms that there is symbolic continuity between the early and late Mexica [Aztec] chacmool," due to early Aztec chacmools containing iconographic nods to Tlaloc.

A second chacmool discovery from the Templo Mayor, dating to a later period, displays iconographic features which are distinct from the larger corpus of chacmool figures but consistent with other sculptures (Tlaloc ritual vessels and bench reliefs) found in a similar context at the Templo Mayor. Whereas Tlaloc's eyes are generally represented with a round goggle-like frame, the later chacmool, the vessels, and the bench relief feature a rectangular eye frame within which almond eyes are engraved. All three sculptures also include large fangs at the corners of the god's mouth. The ornaments worn by the later chacmool and included in the vessels and the bench relief also differ from other representations of Tlaloc. The later chacmool, vessels, and bench relief sport oversized circular earspools, rather than the characteristic earspools with a square plug and central dangal; they are also adorned with a multistrand, beaded collar in which one strand has larger beads that have been interpreted to be hanging bells. The chacmool holds onto a cuauhxicalli vessel that is engraved with the face of Tlaloc, including the same rectangular eye and mouth features.

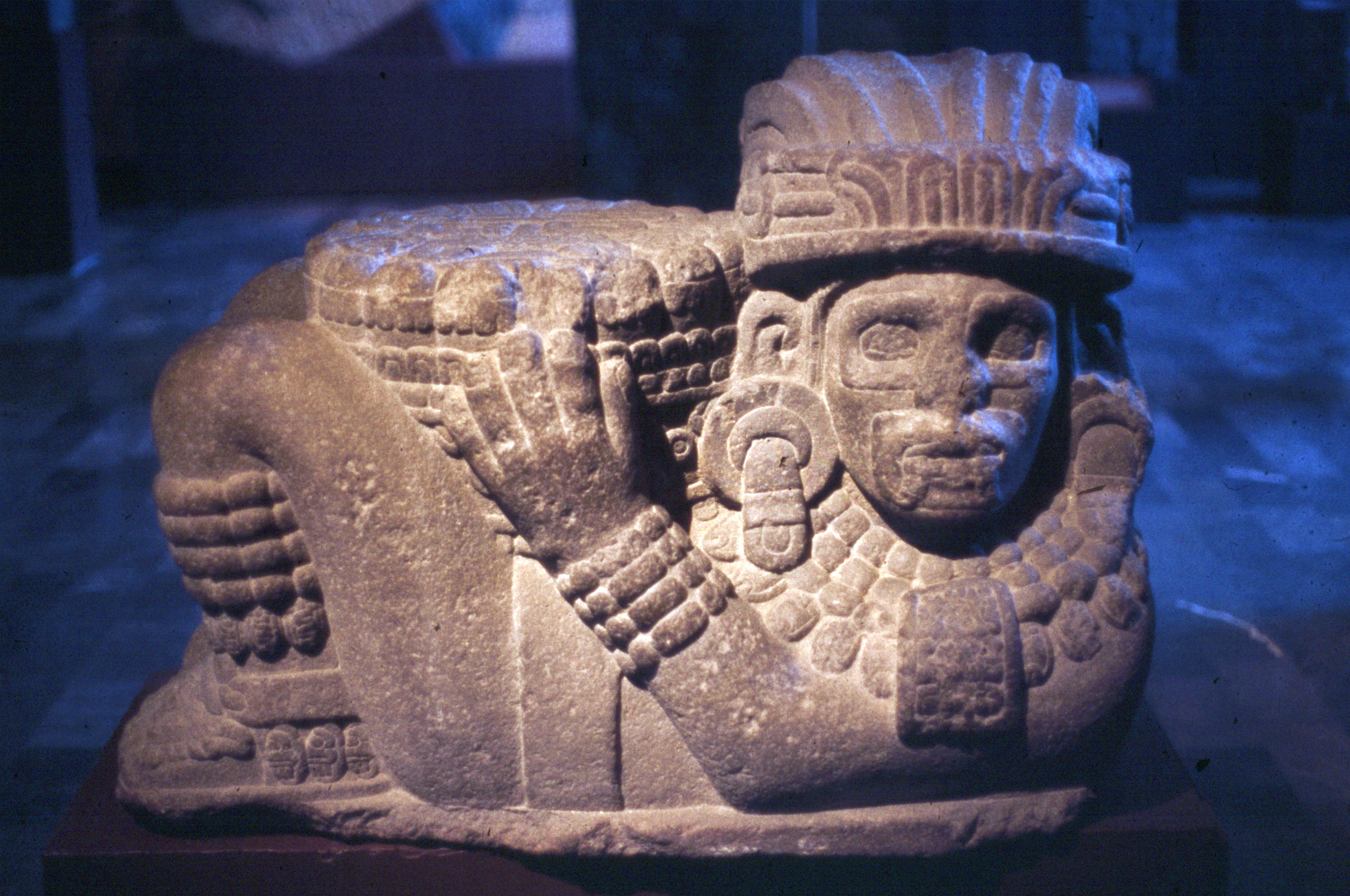
Aztec chacmool, found in 1942 in Mexico City, now located at the Museo Nacional de Antropologia in Mexico City, Mexico

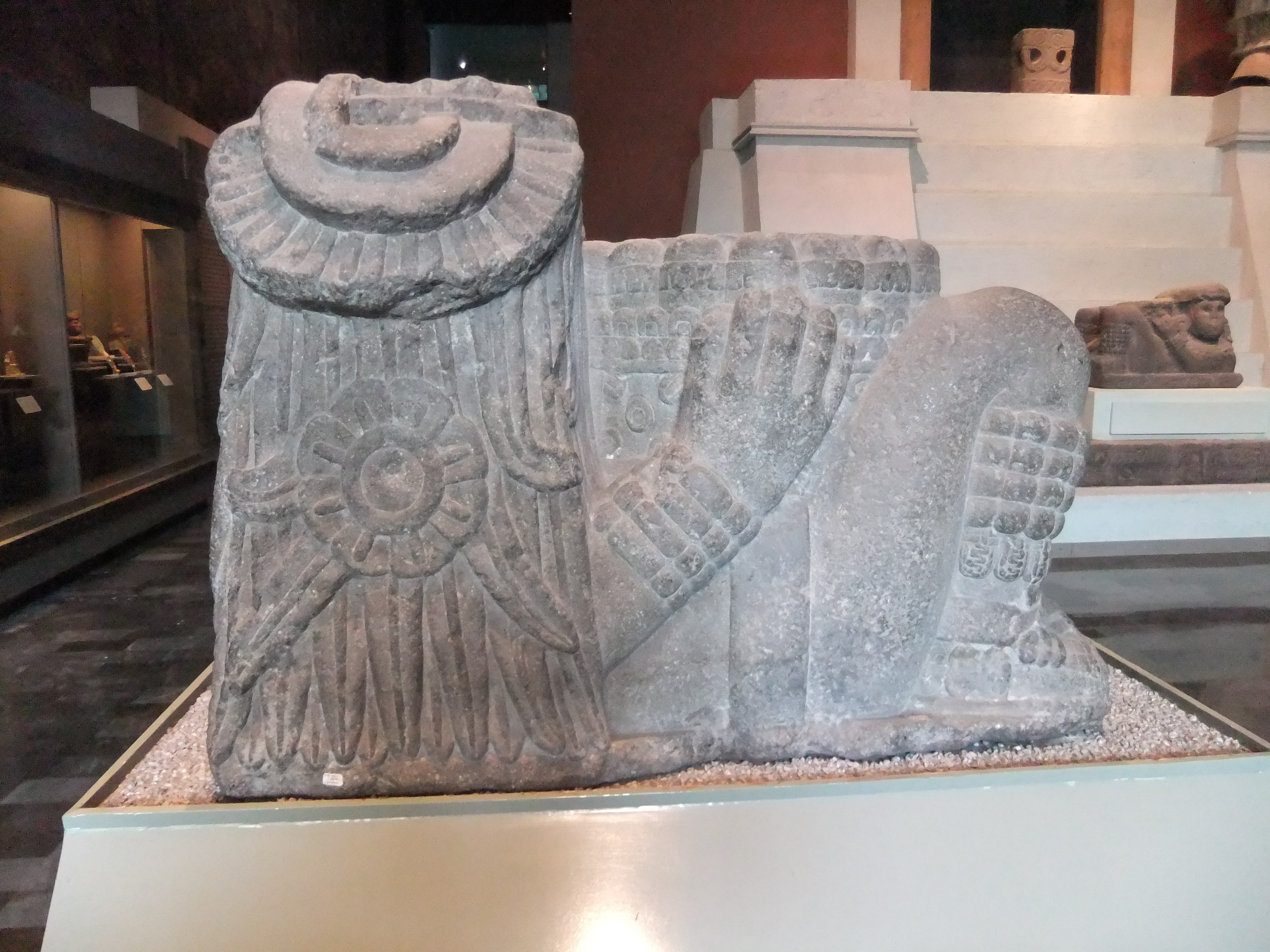
Backside of an Aztec chacmool, found in 1942 in Mexico City, now located in the Museo Nacional de Antropologia in Mexico City, Mexico

In 1942, archaeologists recovered another chacmool example located a few blocks away from the Templo Mayor. This chacmool has overt iconographic associations with Tlaloc, wearing his mask and holding a cuauhxicalli vessel whose top is carved with the face of Tlaloc (rather than being concave and able to hold something). He is wearing several strands of beaded necklaces, with the outer most ring containing oliva shells, which were a characteristic of Maya costuming. Another Maya influence can be seen in his headdress, which scholars Mary Miller and Marco Samayoa compare to a headdress worn by Maya king Shield Jaguar (also known as Itzamnaaj Bahlam III) of Yaxchilan. Perhaps the most interesting iconographic feature of this chacmool, however, is the large necklace pendant he wears, which Miller and Samayoa argue is a representation of an actual heirloom pendant. They suggest that the pendant was looted from a Maya site, probably "from a stone vessel interred behind a chacmool" and that "its subject is probably the enthroned, resurrected Maize God." This association between chacmools and maize deities is rooted in Maya examples (from which the Aztecs were clearly drawing inspiration, as this example's headdress and shell necklace demonstrate), but does not necessarily mean that the Aztecs would have associated their chacmools with maize deities. In all likelihood, the Aztecs conceived of chacmools as being connected to Tlaloc, as it is his image and associated iconographic characteristics that cover the majority of discovered Aztec chacmools. This chacmool, for instance, features a carving of Tlaloc on its underside, the symbolic meaning of which Miller explores: "With their undersides carved with aquatic symbols, these sculptures seem to float on water. This suspension suggests the liminal qualities of the messenger, the link between earth and supernaturals."

== Interpretations ==
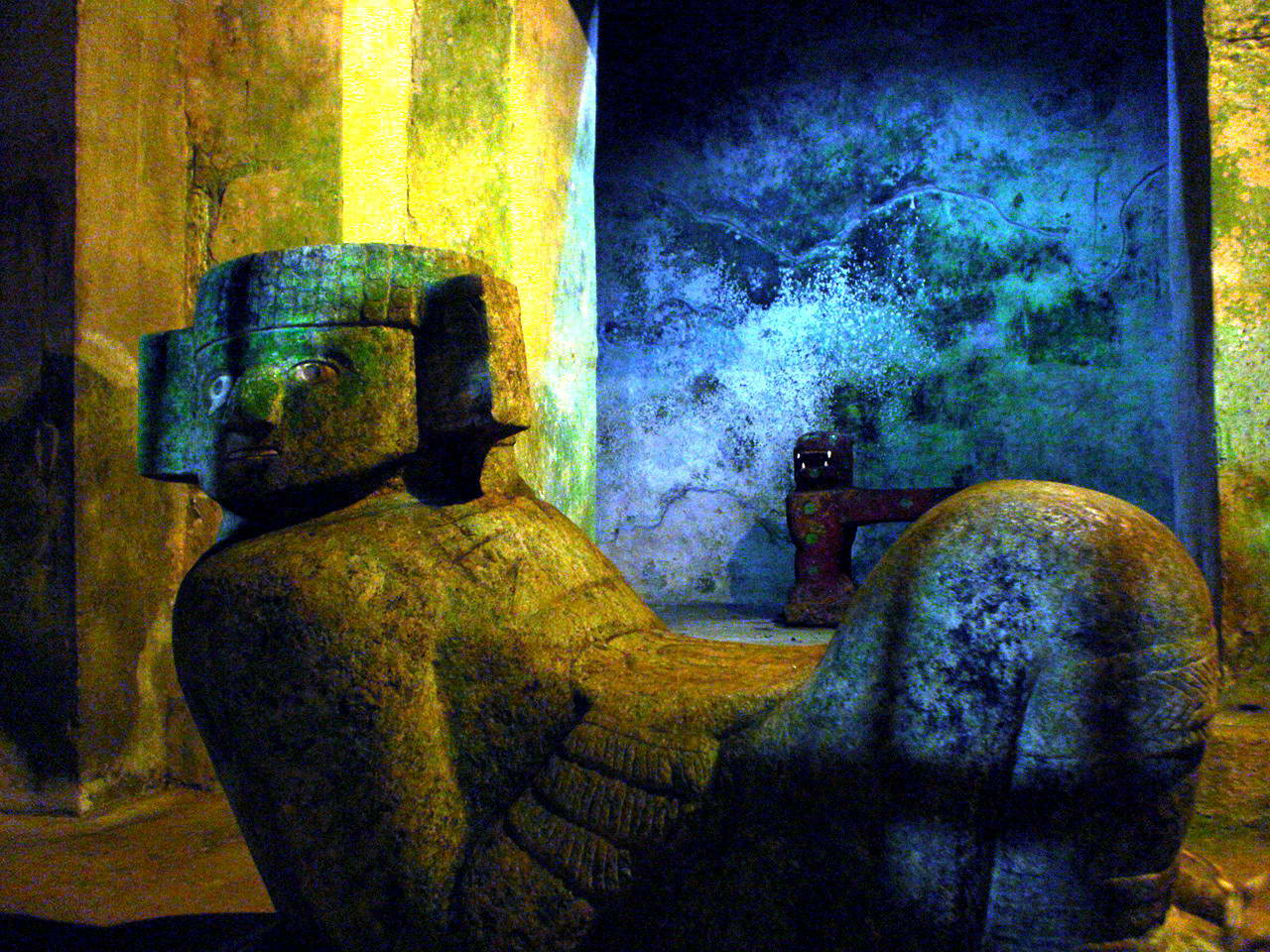
Chacmool inside the Castillo pyramid of Chichen Itza.

The meaning of the chacmool figures varied across time depending upon the geographical and cultural context. Chacmools do not appear to have been worshipped, since they are never found within inner sanctuary of temples or shrines; it appears to have rather been a piece of religious paraphernalia used by the priesthood in the course of their duties. Three uses have generally been attributed to chacmools.

The first interpretation is that the chacmool is an offering table (or tlamanalco) to receive gifts such as pulque, tamales, tortillas, tobacco, turkeys, feathers and incense. The second is that the chacmool was a cuauhxicalli to receive blood and human hearts; this use is particularly relevant to the Aztecs, who used a cuauhxicalli bowl in place of the usual disc-altar. These bowls may have accepted these blood offerings directly or may have been holders for portable cuauhxicalli bowls that were placed within them. A chacmool from Tlaxcala has a bloodied heart sculpted on the underside, supporting this interpretation.

It has also been suggested that chacmools were used as a techcatl, or sacrificial stone over which victims were stretched so their hearts could be cut from their chests. The Crónica Mexicayotl describes such a sacrificial stone as sculpted in the form of a person with a twisted head. Techcatl were not just used for human sacrifice, they were also used in the yacaxapotlaliztli ceremony, where the nose of a future ruler was pierced. Such rituals may also have been executed upon chacmools, and the presence of small nose jewels sculpted onto various chacmools at Chichen Itza and one at Tula has been used to support this idea.

The backward reclining figure of the chacmool presents a defenceless, passive appearance and has been likened by Miller to the positioning of captives in Classic period Maya sculpture and painting. Bent elbows and knees are common in depictions of Maya captives; the full-frontal view of the face is rare in Maya art except among representations of captives. The form of the Chichen Itza chacmools lacks the typical traits of Maya deities and most scholars have assumed that the iconography of Maya chacmools is equivalent to that of the central Mexican examples. Eduard Seler commented in the early 1960s that chacmools in Chichen Itza tended to be located in temple antechambers, where the bowl or disc gripped by the figure served to receive pulque as an offering.

The chacmools at Chichen Itza were found in a combination of chacmool, throne and serpent column; this chacmool-throne-serpent complex was associated with rulership during the Early Postclassic period. The original chacmool described by Le Plongeon in the 19th century included small images of the central Mexican deity Tlaloc on its ear ornaments. Among the Classic period Maya, such Tlaloc imagery was associated with war and human sacrifice. Associations between the rain god, war and human sacrifice may have continued into the Postclassic period as demonstrated by the chacmool within the Castillo at Chichen Itza, which bears small images of the Maya rain god Chaac on its ear ornaments. The chacmools at Tula, with contextual similarity to those at Chichen Itza, probably also represent war captives.

The lack of the representation of chacmools in Central Mexican codices has led to them being associated with a great variety of deities by scholars, including Cinteotl, Tezcatzoncatl and Tlaloc. Both of the chacmools from the Great Temple of Tenochtitlan were clearly associated with Tlaloc. The chacmool found two blocks south of the temple was sculpted with three images of the deity. These included an elaborate relief image of Tlaloc amongst aquatic symbols on the underside, one on the bowl that the figure grips and the last is the Tlaloc mask with characteristic goggles and fangs that is worn by the chacmool.

The fully polychrome chacmool found in situ in the Great Temple was associated with Tlaloc by its placement on the Tlaloc half of the double pyramid. A further Aztec chacmool was described in the 19th century; it is of uncertain origin but stylistically it is typical of Tenochtitlan. It is sculpted on the underside with aquatic imagery and the figure wears a goggle-and-fangs Tlaloc mask. Spanish observers reported the great quantity of human sacrifices during important ceremonies at the Great Temple and the chacmool was probably used during these rituals to symbolise the sacrificed captives as well as receive their blood.

The discs gripped by some chacmools may represent a mirror. Chacmools were placed in entrances in order to receive sacrificial offerings, including human blood and hearts. The aquatic imagery carved onto the underside of some of the figures symbolised that they were floating on water, on the frontier between the physical world and the supernatural realm. This suggests that chacmools acted as messengers between the mortal realm and that of the gods.

Costa Rican chacmools gripped sculpted bowls; these chacmools also served ceremonial purposes although the bowl was used to grind foodstuffs.

== In contemporary culture ==
The short story "Chac Mool" by Mexican novelist Carlos Fuentes is found in his book Los días enmascarados (The masked days), published in 1954. A man named Filiberto buys a chacmool for his art collection, and discovers that the stone is slowly becoming flesh. The idol eventually becomes fully human, dominating his life, causing flooding and other disasters. Filiberto dies by drowning. His story is found in a diary describing the terrors brought on by the idol, and his plans to escape. According to the author, this short story was inspired by news reports from 1952 when the lending of a representation of the Maya rain deity to a Mexican exhibition in Europe had coincided with wet weather there. The short story was included in the 2008 anthology Sun, Stone, and Shadows.

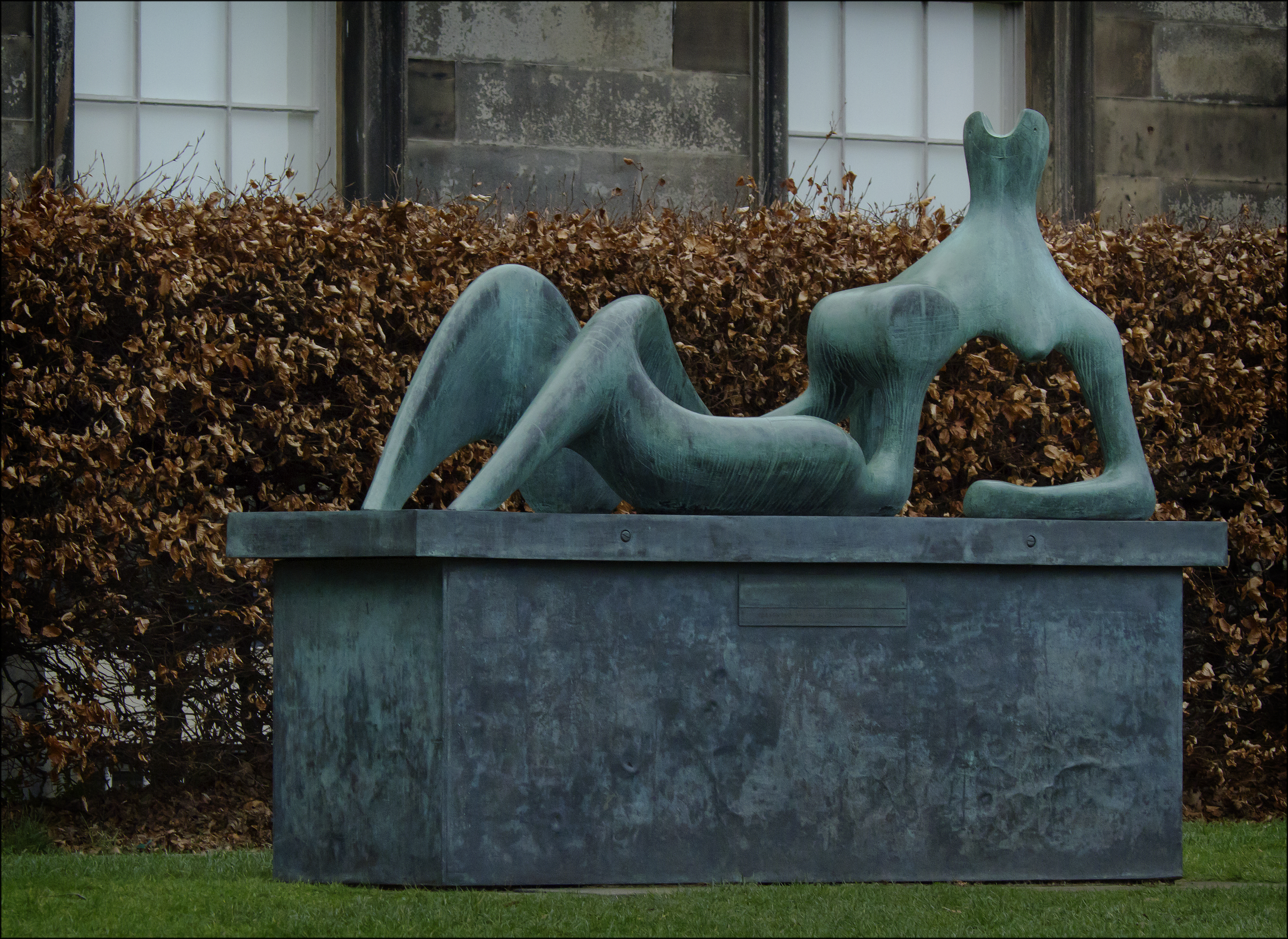
Scottish National Gallery of Modern Art, "Reclining Figure" by Henry Moore. This is just one of many examples of Henry Moore's monumental "Reclining Figure" works.

In Henry Moore's early examples of monumental reclining figures, the artist relied on the cast of a chacmool sculpture he saw in Paris. Commenting on the major impact chacmool sculpted figures had on his early career, Moore stated that "Its stillness and alertness, a sense of readiness – and the whole presence of it, and the legs coming down like columns" were characteristics that inspired his creations.

== General references ==
- Brushwood, John S. (1982). "Los días enmascarados and Cantar de ciegos: Reading the Stories and Reading the Books". In Robert Brody; Charles Rossman (eds.). Carlos Fuentes, a Critical View. Texas Pan American series. Austin, Texas: University of Texas Press. pp. 18–33. ISBN 0-292-71077-1. OCLC 8589372.
- Carballo, Emmanuel (March 1955). "Los días enmascarados". Revista de la Universidad de México (in Spanish). IX (7). Mexico City, Mexico: Universidad Nacional Autónoma de México: 4, 16.
- Cobos, Rafael (1998) [1994]. Síntesis de la Arqueología de El Salvador 1850–1991. Colección Antropología e Historia (in Spanish). Vol. 21. San Salvador, El Salvador: Concultura (Consejo Nacional para la Cultura y el Arte).
- Desmond, Lawrence Gustave; Phyllis Mauch Messenger (1988). A dream of Maya: Augustus and Alice Le Plongeon in nineteenth-century Yucatan. University of New Mexico Press. ISBN 9780826310002. OCLC 16406931.
- Desmond, Lawrence G. "Chacmool." In Davíd Carrasco (ed). The Oxford Encyclopedia of Mesoamerican Cultures. : Oxford University Press, 2001. ISBN 9780195188431
- Filer, Malva E. (April–June 1984). "Los mitos indígenas en la obra de Carlos Fuentes". Revista Iberoamericana (in Spanish). L (127). Pittsburgh, Pennsylvania, US: Instituto Internacional de Literatura Iberoamericana: 475–489. doi:10.5195/REVIBEROAMER.1984.3946. ISSN 0034-9631. OCLC 1763960.
- López Austin, Alfredo; Leonardo López Luján (December 2001). "El chacmool mexica". Caravelle (in Spanish). 76 (76/77, Hommage À Georges Baudot). Toulousse, France: Presses Universitaires du Mirail: 59–84. doi:10.3406/carav.2001.1285. JSTOR 40854948.
- Martin, Simon; Nikolai Grube (2000). Chronicle of the Maya Kings and Queens: Deciphering the Dynasties of the Ancient Maya. London and New York: Thames & Hudson. ISBN 0-500-05103-8. OCLC 47358325.
- Miller, Mary Ellen (March 1985). "A Re-examination of the Mesoamerican Chacmool". The Art Bulletin. 67 (1). College Art Association: 7–17. doi:10.1080/00043079.1985.10788233. JSTOR 3050884.
- Miller, Mary; Karl Taube (2003) [1993]. An Illustrated Dictionary of the Gods and Symbols of Ancient Mexico and the Maya. London: Thames & Hudson. ISBN 0-500-27928-4. OCLC 28801551.
- Read, Kay Almere; Jason González (2000). Handbook of Mesoamerican Mythology. Oxford: ABC-CLIO. ISBN 1-85109-340-0. OCLC 43879188.
- Salisbury, Stephen Jr. (1877). "Dr. Le Plongeon in Yucatan". Proceedings of the American Antiquarian Society. 69: 70–119.
- Solano B., Andrea (21 February 2012). "Arquéologos hallan escultura de piedra precolombina en Guácimo". La Nación (in Spanish). San José, Costa Rica: Grupo Nación S.A.
- Solano B., Andrea (26 February 2012). "Humano y felino, unidos en escultura de piedra". La Nación (in Spanish). San José, Costa Rica: Grupo Nación S.A.
