= John David Hennessey =

Australian writer

John David Hennessey (1847 – 31 July 1935), also known as Rev. J. D. Hennessey and David Hennessey, was a journalist and author. He was born in London and emigrated to Australia in 1875. He lived in Queensland, New South Wales, and Victoria.

Hennessey was a Methodist and Congregational minister and preached at the Wharf street Congregational Church in Brisbane and the Pitt street Congregational Church in Sydney. He founded the Australian Christian World in 1886 and edited it until 1891. In 1894 he edited the Australian Field, a weekly agricultural paper.

Hennessey retired from journalism when he was about seventy years old, however he continued his literary work until shortly before his death, which occurred after a brief illness. He was buried at the Dromana Cemetery.

As well as short stories in magazines in Australia and England, Hennessey published several novels. One, The Outlaw, was awarded second prize of £400 in a £1,000 novel competition. Hennessey kept a diary on his voyage from England to Australia on the ship Lammermuir and it is now held in the State Library of Queensland.

== Bibliography ==
- The Dis-Honourable (1895)
- An Australian Bush Track ('The Bush Track: A Story of the Australian Bush') (1896)
- Wynnum ('Wynnum White's Wickedness') (1896)
- A Lost Identity ('The Bells of Sydney'; 'Gunnery of Church-Conset') (1897)
- The New Chum Farmer (1897)
- The Outlaw (1913)
- A Tail of Gold (1914)
- The Caves of Shend (1915)
- The Cords of Vanity (1920)
