= James Churchward =

British writer (1851–1936)

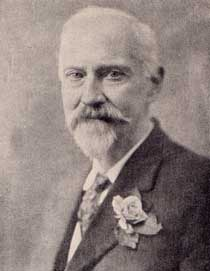
James Churchward

James Churchward (27 February 1851 – 4 January 1936) was a British writer, inventor, engineer, and fisherman.

Churchward is most notable for proposing the existence of a lost continent, called "Mu," in the Pacific Ocean. His writings on Mu are considered to be pseudoscience.

== Life ==
Churchward was born in Bridestow, Okehampton, Devon at Stone House to Henry and Matilda (née Gould) Churchward. James had four brothers and four sisters. In November 1854, his father Henry died and the family moved in with Matilda's parents in the hamlet of Kigbear, near Okehampton. Census records indicate the family moved to London when James was 18, after his maternal grandfather George Gould died. His younger brother Albert Churchward (1852–1925) became a Masonic author.

Churchward went out to Southeast Asia, becoming a tea planter in Sri Lanka. He immigrated to the US in the 1890s. In Churchward's biography, entitled My Friend Churchey and His Sunken Continent, he was said to have discussed "Mu" with Augustus Le Plongeon and his wife in the 1890s.

In the United States, Churchward patented NCV (nickel, chrome, vanadium) steel, which was used to manufacture armor plating to protect ships during World War I. He also developed other steel alloys. After a patent-infringement settlement in 1914, Churchward retired to his 7+ acre estate on Lake Wononskopomuc in Lakeville, Connecticut, to think more about questions he had from his Pacific travels. At the age of 75, he published The Lost Continent of Mu: Motherland of Man (1926). He claimed this proved the existence of a lost continent, called Mu, in the Pacific Ocean.

== Claims and hypothesis ==
According to Churchward, Mu "extended from somewhere north of Hawaii to the south as far as the Fijis and Easter Island." He claimed Mu was the site of the Garden of Eden and the home of 64,000,000 inhabitants – known as the Naacals. Its civilisation, which flourished 50,000 years before Churchward's day, was technologically more advanced than his own. He said the ancient civilisations of India, Babylon, Persia, Egypt, and the Mayas were the decayed remnants of Mu's colonies.

Churchward claimed to have gained his knowledge of this lost land after befriending an Indian priest, who taught him to read an ancient dead language (spoken by only three people in all of India). The priest disclosed the existence of several ancient tablets, written by the Naacals. He allowed Churchward to see these records after initial reluctance. His knowledge remained incomplete, as the available tablets were mere fragments of a larger text. Churchward claimed to have found verification and further information in the records of other ancient peoples.

His writings attempt to describe the civilisation of Mu, its history, inhabitants, and influence on subsequent history and civilisations.

Churchward claimed that the ancient Egyptian sun-god Ra originated with the Mu; he claimed that "Rah" was the word which the Naacals used for "sun", as well as for their god and rulers.

== Scientific rebuttal ==
Alfred Metraux undertook research on Easter Island in the 1930s, and in 1940 published a monograph on Easter Island which includes a rebuttal of the hypothesis that Easter Island was a remnant of a sunken continent. In the second half of the twentieth century, improvements in oceanography, in particular understanding of seafloor spreading and plate tectonics, have left little scientific basis for claims of geologically recent lost continents such as Mu.

American science writer Martin Gardner wrote that Churchward's books contain geological and archaeological errors and are regarded by scholars as a hoax. The archaeologist Stephen Williams, in Fantastic Archaeology (1991), described his writings as pseudoscience. Williams has written that Churchward's "translations are outrageous, his geology, in both mechanics and dating, is absurd, and his mishandling of archaeological data, as in the Valley of Mexico, is atrocious."

Gordon Stein in Encyclopedia of Hoaxes (1993) has noted that Churchward's claims have no scientific basis. According to Stein "it is difficult to assess whether Churchward really believed what he said about Mu, or whether he was knowingly writing fiction."

Brian M. Fagan has written that Churchward's evidence for Mu was made from "personal testimonials, false translations, notably of tablets from Mesoamerica, and spurious reconstructions from archaeological and artistic remains. Although it has attracted some following, it has never received scholarly or scientific support."

== Popular culture ==
Churchward is mentioned in fiction in the short stories "Through the Gates of the Silver Key" by H. P. Lovecraft, "Out of the Aeons" by Lovecraft and Hazel Heald, and The Fitzgerald Contraction by Miles J. Breuer. Churchward and the lost island of Mu also appear in Philip K. Dick's Confessions of a Crap Artist.

The British anarchist situationist band KLF, also known as the Justified Ancients of Mu Mu, often refer to Mu Mu land and were inspired by The Illuminatus! Trilogy, and much of their work was Discordian in nature.

Churchward's writings are a key influence for the plot of the anime series RahXephon.

Churchward's writings were satirised by occult writer Raymond Buckland in his novel Mu Revealed, written under the pseudonym "Tony Earll" (an anagram for "not really").

In James Rollins' novel Deep Fathom, Churchward is the great-grandfather of character Karen Grace, who takes part in revealing the mystery of Mu.

Churchward's writings are used as a source for the following books and video games:

- Lemuria and Atlantis: Studying the Past to Survive the Future by Shirley Andrews.
- Lost Cities of China, Central Asia & India by David Hatcher Childress
- Lost Cities of Atlantis, Ancient Europe & the Mediterranean by David Hatcher Childress
- Timeless Earth by Peter Kolosimo
- The Christ Conspiracy: The Greatest Story ever Sold by Acharya S
- Suns of God: Krishna, Buddha, and Christ Unveiled by Acharya S
- Mu, a comic book from the Corto Maltese series, by Hugo Pratt
- The lost continent of Mu in the Pacific Ocean on Earth is where the Ancients of planet Roak came from in the Star Ocean Super NES video game by Enix.

The lost continent of Mu is referenced in Daniel Pinkwater's teen novel Alan Mendelsohn, Boy From Mars (1979).

UK-based electronic music record-label Planet Mu has released three compilation albums with titles copied from Churchward's own books: The Cosmic Forces of Mu (2001), Children of Mu (2004), and Sacred Symbols of Mu (2006).

The 1940s-60s US comic strip, Alley Oop by Vic Hamlin, features the inhabitant of two adjacent primitive kingdoms: 'Moo' & Lem', obviously both derived from Lemuria.

== Works ==
- Fishing Among the 1,000 Islands of the St. Lawrence (1894)
- A Big Game and Fishing Guide to Northeastern Maine (1897)

=== Books about Mu ===
1. The Lost Continent of Mu, the Motherland of Men (1926)
2. The Children of Mu (1931)
3. The Sacred Symbols of Mu (1933)
4. Cosmic Forces of Mu (1934)
5. Second Book of Cosmic Forces of Mu (1935)

=== Posthumous publications ===
- The Books of the Golden Age (written in 1927 but first published 1997)
- Copies of Stone Tablets Found by William Niven at Santiago Ahuizoctla Near Mexico City, a booklet of "thirty-some" pages, written in 1927 but first published in 2014 where it was included in the book The Stone Tablets of Mu by James Churchward's great-grandson Jack Churchward
