= Augustus Le Plongeon =

British photographer and archaeologist (1825–1908)

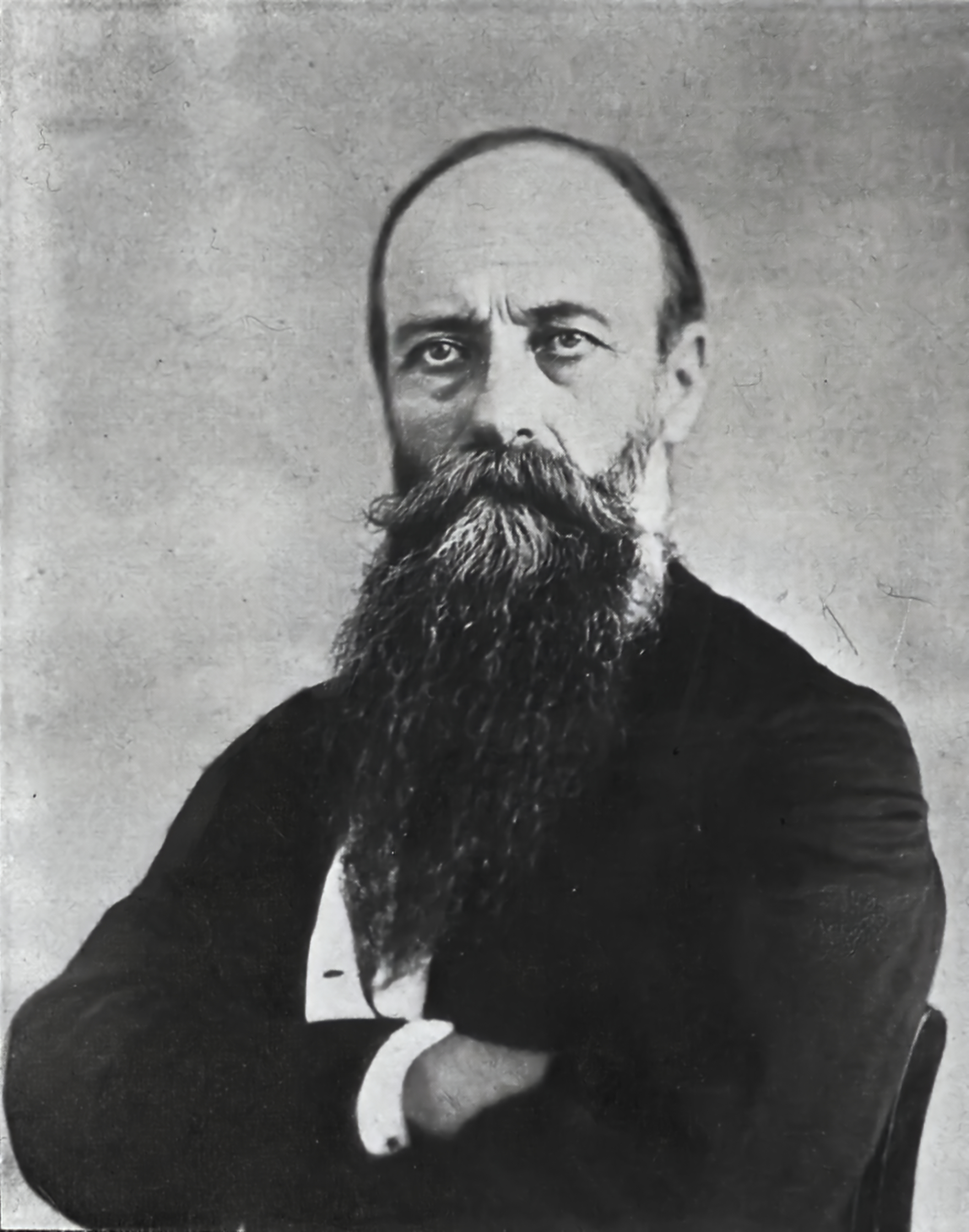
- Photograph by Alice Dixon Le Plongeon
- Born: 4 May 1825; Island of Jersey
- Died: 13 December 1908 (aged 83); Brooklyn, New York, U.S.
- Occupation: Antiquarian
- Spouse: Alice Dixon Le Plongeon
- Writing career
- Subjects: Maya civilization, Atlantis

Augustus Henry Julian Le Plongeon (4 May 1825 – 13 December 1908) was a British-American antiquarian and photographer who studied the pre-Columbian ruins of America, particularly those of the Maya civilization on the northern Yucatán Peninsula. While his writings contain many notions that were not well received by his contemporaries and were later disproven, Le Plongeon left a lasting legacy in his photographs documenting the ancient ruins. He was one of the earliest proponents of Mayanism.

== Early life and careers ==
Le Plongeon was born on the island of Jersey on 4 May 1825. At 19, he sailed to South America and shipwrecked off the coast of Chile. While there he settled in Valparaiso and taught mathematics, drawing, and languages at a local college. In 1849 he sailed to San Francisco during the California gold rush to work as a surveyor, and also apprenticed to become a doctor of medicine. One of his accomplishments as a surveyor included drawing a plan for the layout of the town of Marysville, California in the Central Valley in 1851. Augustus was paid for his services as a surveyor with land deeds. He profited from the sale of these plots and this income would fund the majority of his archaeological expeditions.

Le Plongeon traveled to England and saw a demonstration for new photographic processes at The Great Exhibition. He then stayed in England to study photography under William Fox Talbot. Augustus wanted to test these methods in tropical climates so he spent time traveling to St. Thomas, Virgin Islands as well as Mexico, Australia, China, and the Pacific Islands. He returned to San Francisco to open a daguerreotype portrait studio on Clay Street. In 1862, he traveled to Lima, Peru and opened another photography studio and an "electro-hydropathic" medical clinic based on an early form of alternative medicine.

== Travels in Peru ==
Le Plongeon pioneered the use of photography as a tool for his studies. He began using the wet collodion glass-plate negative process he used for studio portraits to record his explorations. He traveled extensively all over Peru for eight years visiting and photographing ancient ruins, including Tiahuanaco. Augustus also joined a number of E. G. Squier's expeditions and took photographs out in the field. Le Plongeon was influenced by the work of Charles Étienne Brasseur de Bourbourg, John Lloyd Stephens, and Frederick Catherwood. These works, in combination with his own explorations in Peru, led Le Plongeon to believe that civilization had its origins in the New World.

While in Peru Augustus became interested in the causes of earthquakes. He was able to observe the 1868 Arica earthquake and he studied the resulting damage and interviewed people about what they experienced. During this time Le Plongeon began to speak out against abuses by Jesuit priests and the Catholic Church in Peru. He published two anti-Jesuit books, La religion de Jesus comparada con las ensenanzas de la Iglesia (1867), and Los Jesuitas y el Peru (1869).

In 1870, he left Peru and traveled back once again to San Francisco where he gave a number of illustrated lectures at the California Academy of Sciences on Peruvian archaeology and the causes of earthquakes. His travels then continued on to New York City, and by 1871 he was at the British Museum in London studying Mesoamerican manuscripts.

== Alice Dixon Le Plongeon ==
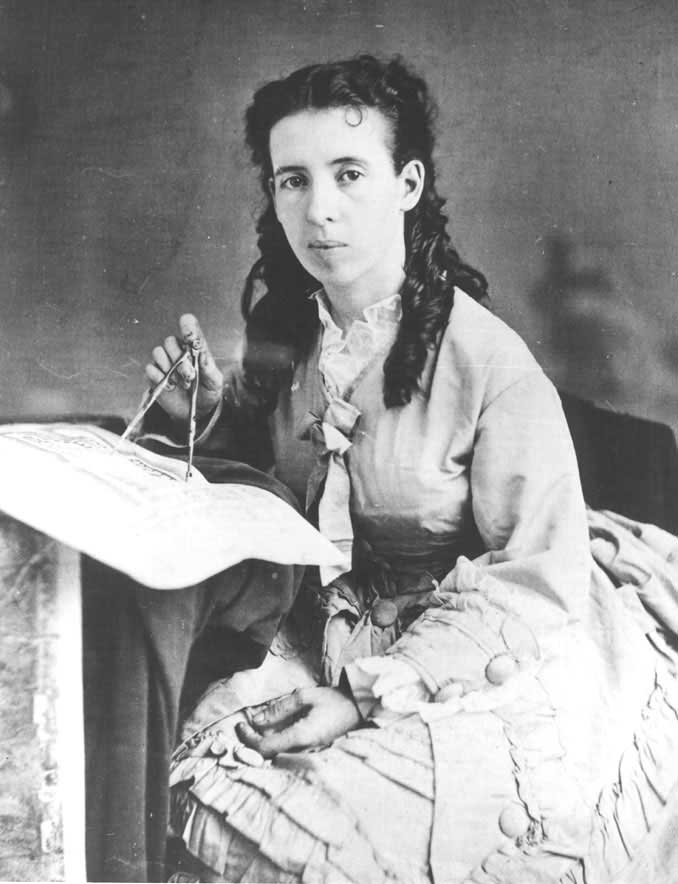
Portrait of Alice Dixon, taken by her husband, Augustus

While in London he met Alice Dixon, the woman with whom he would collaborate for the rest of his life. Alice was born in London in 1851. Her father, Henry Dixon, was recognized in the late nineteenth century for his contribution to the development of panchromatic photography, and for his photos of London architecture taken for the Society for Photographing Relics of Old London. Alice learned the techniques of photography from her father and worked as an assistant in his studio. After meeting Augustus, she became interested in ancient American civilizations and studied John L. Stephen's Incidents of Travel in Yucatan. She agreed to accompany Augustus on an archaeology expedition to study Maya ruins in Mexico. The pair left for New York to finalize preparations for the trip. They married in New York before traveling to Mexico in 1873.

== Travels in Yucatán ==
In 1873, the Le Plongeons traveled to Yucatán to study ancient Maya sites. Their goal was to explore the possibility of links between the Maya and the civilizations of ancient Egypt and Atlantis. Their first stop was in Mérida and they stayed there while Alice recovered from yellow fever. During her recuperation, the couple made connections with local scholars and both Augustus and Alice learned to speak Yucatec Maya. After Alice had recovered, the Le Plongeons made a short excursion to Uxmal.

The Le Plongeons were in Yucatán during the Caste War, a conflict between the Maya, called the Chan Santa Cruz, and the army of Yucatán. When they traveled to Chichen Itza in 1875, they were accompanied by a military escort. When they arrived at the site, local Maya men were hired to clear the vegetation and help with excavations.

The Le Plongeons were some of the first people to photograph and study Chichen Itza. Their photographic work was methodical and systematic, and they took hundreds of 3D photos. They documented entire Maya buildings, such as the "Governor's Palace" at Uxmal, in overlapping photos by placing the camera on a tall tripod or scaffold to correct for perspective and then processed the plates in the unlit rooms of Maya buildings. In addition to entire facades of buildings, they also photographed small artifacts, and architectural details such as bas-reliefs, Maya hieroglyphic inscriptions, and sculptures. They excavated buildings, drew maps and copied murals, and made molds of bas-reliefs.

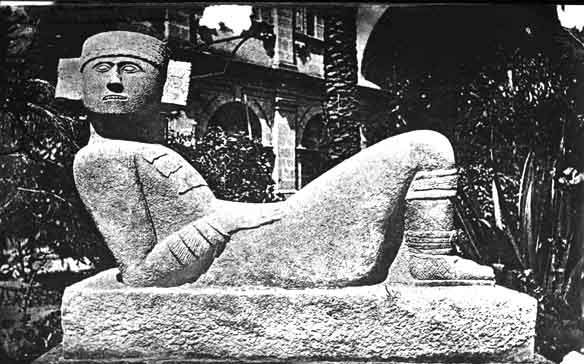
Chacmool statue from the Chichen Itza site

At Chichen Itza they excavated a structure known as the Platform of the Eagles and Jaguars and unearthed a large statue or altar figurine. They coined the name "Chaacmol" (later "Chac Mool" or chacmool) for it. Although their derivation of the name is known now to have had no association with figures of this type, the name has remained in general use among later archaeologists. This statue would later be used as a demonstration of Toltec influences at the site, with other examples found at the Toltec capital, Tula. They also documented their excavation of the Platform of Venus with photos as well as plan and cross-section drawings.

From 1873 to 1884, the Le Plongeons visited and photographed other Maya sites such as Izamal, Isla Mujeres, Cozumel, Cancún, and Ake, and traveled to Belize (British Honduras). During this time they made a few trips back to New York to attempt to sell bas-relief molds to museums, give lectures, and solicit financial backing for their studies.

== Theories ==
By the 1880s, while most Mayanists accepted that the Maya civilization postdated Ancient Egypt, Le Plongeon stood by his theories. He cited his years of fieldwork and studies of archival sources, and challenged those he considered "armchair" archaeologists to debate the issues. However, as evidence mounted against cultural diffusion, Le Plongeon became marginalized and his theories fell further outside the growing mainstream of Maya archaeology.

Le Plongeon insisted that the symbols of Freemasonry could be traced to the ancient Maya and that the ancient knowledge had come to ancient Egypt from the ancient Maya by way of Atlantis. He and Alice constructed an imaginative "history," with the Maya sites in Yucatán being the cradle of civilization, with civilization then traveling east first to Atlantis and later to Ancient Egypt. The Le Plongeons named kings and queens of these dynasties and said that various artworks were portraits of such ancient royalty (such as the famous Chacmool, which the couple excavated at Chichén Itzá). The Le Plongeons reconstructed a detailed but fanciful story of Queen Moo and Prince Coh (also known as "Chac Mool") in which Prince Coh's death resulted in the erection of monuments in his honor (similar to the commemoration of Prince Albert by Queen Victoria).

== Works ==
- Vestiges of the Mayas (New York, 1881)
- Sacred Mysteries Among the Mayas and the Quiches, 11,500 Years Ago (New York, 1886)

== Later career and legacy ==
While most of Le Plongeon's contemporaries dismissed his theories, individuals such as Ignatius L. Donnelly and Helena Blavatsky drew upon Le Plongeon's research for their own theories. Augustus spent the remainder of his life in Brooklyn, New York, writing about the connections between Maya and Egypt and defending himself against detractors. Augustus le Plongeon died in Brooklyn in 1908 at the age of eighty-three; Alice followed in 1910 at the age of fifty-nine.

A collection of the works of the Le Plongeons currently resides at the Getty Research Institute in Los Angeles. The archive contains original records covering their travels from the 1860s through the early 1900s, including diaries, unpublished scholarly manuscripts and notes, correspondence, and extensive photographic documentation of ancient architecture and sculpture, city views, and ethnographic studies.

Le Plongeon was elected a member of the American Antiquarian Society in 1878.

== See also ==
- Naacal

== Gallery ==
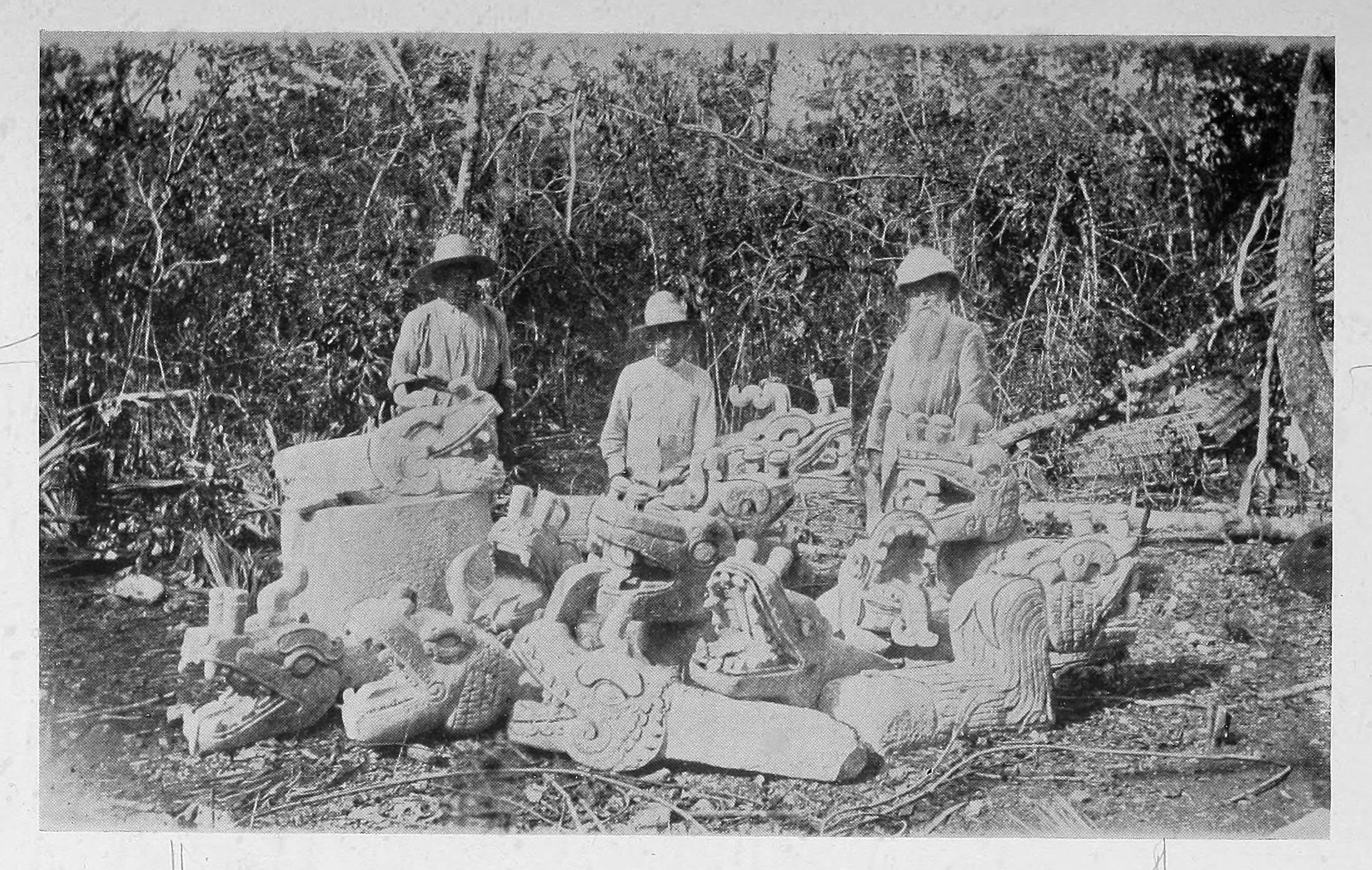
Naga Serpent Heads found in Cay's Mausoleum, Chichen - Queen Móo and the Egyptian sphinx, 1896

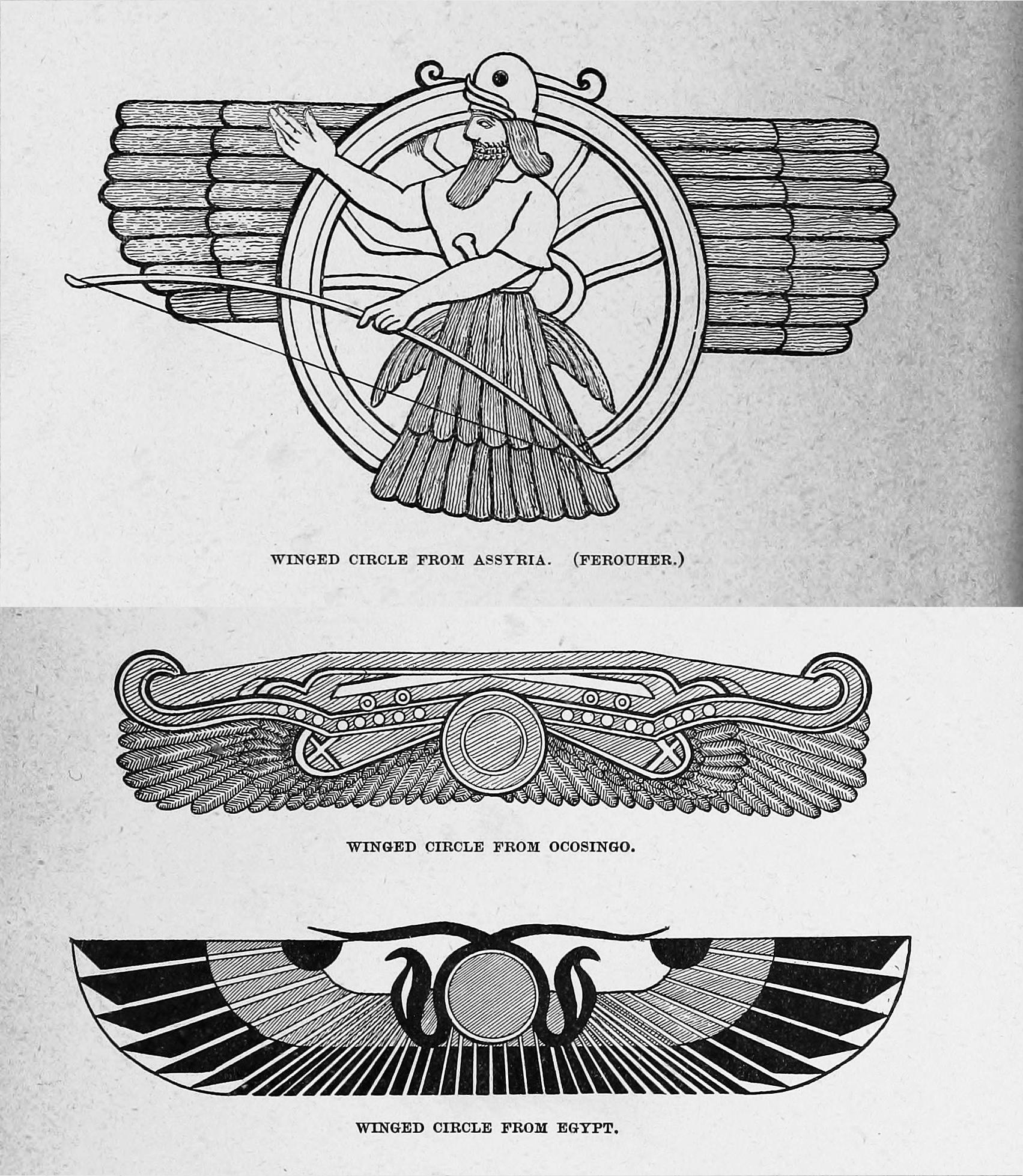
Winged Circles from Assyria, Ocosingo & Egypt - Queen Móo and the Egyptian sphinx, 1896
