= List of ship launches in 1822 =

The list of ship launches in 1822 includes a chronological list of some ships launched in 1822.

| Date | Ship | Class | Builder | Location | Country | Notes |
|---|---|---|---|---|---|---|
| 1 January | Samarang | Atholl-class corvette | | Cochin | India | For Royal Navy. |
| 2 January | Hannibal | Merchantman | | New York | United States | For private owner. |
| 8 January | Diana | Leda-class frigate | George Parkin | Chatham Dockyard | United Kingdom | For Royal Navy. |
| Unknown date | Onyx | Cherokee-class brig-sloop | | Sheerness Dockyard | United Kingdom | For Royal Navy. |
| January | Kingston | Full-rigged ship | John M. & Willia Gales | Sunderland | United Kingdom | For Pirie & Co. |
| 10 February | Herald | Merchantman | Philip Laing | Deptford | United Kingdom | For Philip Laing. |
| 13 February | Hereford | Sloop | | Hereford | United Kingdom | For private owner. |
| 22 February | Sovereign | Steamship | J. Duke | Dover | United Kingdom | For private owner. |
| 22 February | Toward Castle | Steamship | James Lang | Dumbarton | United Kingdom | For private owner. |
| February | Boreas | Merchantman | James Johnson | Sunderland | United Kingdom | For private owner. |
| 9 March | Duke of Lancaster | Steamship | Mottershead and Hayes | Liverpool | United Kingdom | For private owner. |
| 13 March | Royal Mail | Paddle steamer | Bland & Challoner | Liverpool | United Kingdom | For H. Williams. |
| 21 March | Timandra | Merchantman | H. Barrick | Whitby | United Kingdom | For Barrick & Co. |
| 22 March | Partridge | Cherokee-class brig-sloop | | Plymouth Dockyard | United Kingdom | For Royal Navy. |
| 26 March | Rattlesnake | Atholl-class corvette | | Chatham Dockyard | United Kingdom | For Royal Navy. |
| 26 March | Weazle | Cherokee-class brig-sloop | | Chatham Dockyard | United Kingdom | For Royal Navy. |
| March | Potomac | Raritan-class frigate | | Washington Navy Yard | United States | For United States Navy. |
| 8 April | Bramble | Cutter | | Plymouth Dockyard | United Kingdom | For Royal Navy. |
| 9 April | City of Glasgow | Steamship | John Scott & Sons. | Greenock | United Kingdom | For private owner. |
| 19 April | Richmond | Full-rigged ship | Hudson | Chichester | United Kingdom | For private owner. |
| 22 April | Gazelle | Gazelle-class schooner | | Bayonne | France | For French Navy. |
| 22 April | St. Patrick | Steamship | Mottishead & Hayes | Liverpool | United Kingdom | For St. George Steam Packet Company. |
| 23 April | Atholl | Steamship | | Perth | United Kingdom | For private owner. |
| 23 April | St. George | Steamship | Dawson and Pearson | Liverpool | United Kingdom | For St. George Steam Packet Company. |
| 24 April | Sir Edward Paget | Passenger ship | Wigram | Blackwall | United Kingdom | For private owner. |
| April | Army | Merchantman | | Whitby | United Kingdom | For private owner. |
| April | Cynthia | Merchantman | | Whitby | United Kingdom | For private owner. |
| April | Livonia | Merchantman | | Whitby | United Kingdom | For private owner. |
| April | Timandra | Merchantman | | Whitby | United Kingdom | For private owner. |
| April | Twist | Merchantman | | Whitby | United Kingdom | For private owner. |
| 8 May | Portland | Southampton-class frigate | Edward Churchill | Plymouth Dockyard | United Kingdom | For Royal Navy. |
| 12 May | Vestovoi | Spechnyi-class frigate | A. M. Kurochkin | Arkhangelsk | Russia | For Imperial Russian Navy. |
| 20 May | Albion | Steamship | | | United Kingdom | For private owner. |
| 20 May | Prince Llewellyn | Steamship | Wilson and Gladstone | Liverpool | United Kingdom | For private owner. |
| 20 May | Sysoi Velikii | Selafail-class ship of the line | A. M. Kurochkin | Arkhangelsk | Russia | For Imperial Russian Navy. |
| 22 May | Russell | Vengeur-class ship of the line | William Stone | Deptford Dockyard | United Kingdom | For Royal Navy. |
| 23 May | Comet | Paddle tug | Boulton, Watt & Co. | Deptford Dockyard | United Kingdom | For Royal Navy. |
| 4 June | Bolton | Full-rigged ship | Dawson & Pearson | Liverpool | United Kingdom | For private owner. |
| 11 June | Highflyer | Quail-class schooner | | Woolwich Dockyard | United Kingdom | For Royal Navy. |
| 20 June | Hercules | Merchantman | Fishburn & Brodrick | Whitby | United Kingdom | For Edward Chapman. |
| 21 June | Procris | Cherokee-class brig-sloop | | Chatham Dockyard | United Kingdom | For Royal Navy. |
| 21 June | Winchester | Southampton-class frigate | Henry Canham | Woolwich Dockyard | United Kingdom | For Royal Navy. |
| 20 June | Gremiaschii | Sixth rate | A. A. Popov | Saint Petersburg | Russia | For Imperial Russian Navy. |
| 11 July | King of the Netherlands | Steamship | Wigram & Gren | Blackwall, London | United Kingdom | For London and Rotterdam Steam Packet Company. |
| 31 July | Rota | Frigate | | Holmen, Copenhagen | Denmark | For Royal Danish Navy. |
| 1 August | Lancier | Dragon-class brig | | Lorient | France | For French Navy. |
| 2 August | Gloriole | Iris-class schooner | | Bayonne | France | For French Navy. |
| 2 August | Philomèle | Iris-class schooner | | Lorient | France | For French Navy. |
| 5 August | Hebé | Pomone-class corvette | | Havre de Grâce | France | For French Navy. |
| 22 August | Emgeiten | Third rate | G. S. Isakov | Saint Petersburg | Russia | For Imperial Russian Navy. |
| 24 August | The Sovereign | Packet ship | | Paisley | United Kingdom | For private owner. |
| 6 September | Cuirassier | Dragon-class brig | | Toulon | France | For French Navy. |
| 16 September | Vestale | Vestale-class frigate | | Rochefort | France | For French Navy. |
| 22 September | Strela | Lugger | I. Y. Osminin | Sevastopol | Russia | For Imperial Russian Navy. |
| September | Assistance | Barque | | | United Kingdom | For private owner. |
| 1 October | King George the Fourth | Steamship | Brown | Perth | United Kingdom | For private owne. |
| 1 October | Monarch | Steamship | J. Duke | Dover | United Kingdom | For private owner. |
| 9 October | Lusitano | Steamship | Humble and Hurry | Liverpool | United Kingdom | For private owner. |
| 10 October | Royal Gift | Cutter | | Leith | United Kingdom | For private owner. |
| 10 October | St. George | Steamship | Mottershead and Hayes | Liverpool | United Kingdom | For private owner. |
| October | Four Brothers | Merchantman | James Lowes | Vlissingen | Netherlands | For private owner. |
| 15 November | Lion | Cutter | Thomas Inman | Lymington | United Kingdom | For Board of Customs. |
| 15 November | Madagascar | Seringapatam-class frigate | British East India Company | Bombay | India | For Royal Navy. |
| 15 November | Repulse | Cutter | William Good | Bucklers Hard | United Kingdom | For Board of Customs. |
| 15 November | Termagant | Atholl-class corvette | British East India Company | Cochin | India | For Royal Navy. |
| 1 December | Cameleon | Cutter | Hedgcock | Dover | United Kingdom | For Board of Customs. |
| 24 December | Dragon | Dragon-class brig | | Brest | France | For French Navy. |
| Unknown date | Advena | Snow | W. Potts | Sunderland | United Kingdom | For W. Potts. |
| Unknown date | Anne | Brig | | Sunderland | United Kingdom | For private owner. |
| Unknown date | Argo | Merchantman | John M. & William Gales | Sunderland | United Kingdom | For Scott & Horn. |
| Unknown date | Asia | Merchantman | Philip Laing | Sunderland | United Kingdom | For private owner. |
| Unknown date | Batavia | Full-rigged ship | | Dunkirk | France | For Royal Netherlands Navy. |
| Unknown date | Beagle | Full-rigged ship | | | United States | For United States Navy. |
| Unknown date | Bolivar | Schooner | | | Gran Colombia | For private owner. |
| Unknown date | Boyne | West Indiaman | William Smith | Newcastle upon Tyne | United Kingdom | For H. Wright. |
| Unknown date | Congress | Frigate | | Lisbon | Portugal | For Portuguese Navy. |
| Unknown date | Doris | Snow | Jon M. & William Gales | Sunderland | United Kingdom | For John M. & William Gales. |
| Unknown date | Fame | Merchantman | | Sunderland | United Kingdom | For private owner. |
| Unknown date | Ferret | Schooner | | | United States | For United States Navy. |
| Unknown date | Flora | Full-rigged ship | | | Netherlands | For Royal Netherlands Navy. |
| Unknown date | Fox | Unrated | | | United States | For United States Navy. |
| Unknown date | Greyhound | Schooner | | | United States | For United States Navy. |
| Unknown date | Hylton Castle | Snow | John M. & William Gales | Sunderland | United Kingdom | For R. Scurfield. |
| Unknown date | Maas | Fourth rate | | Rotterdam | Netherlands | For Royal Netherlands Navy. |
| Unknown date | Malta | Snow | John M. & William Gales | Sunderland | United Kingdom | For John White. |
| Unknown date | Malta | Snow | John M. & William Gales | Sunderland | United Kingdom | For Mr. Boulby. |
| Unknown date | Middelburg | Full-rigged ship | | | Netherlands | For Royal Netherlands Navy. |
| Unknown date | Montezuma | Packet ship | Robert Burton | Philadelphia, Pennsylvania | United States | For Thomas P. Cope. |
| Unknown date | Nausery | Brig | | Bombay | India | For an Imaum. |
| Unknown date | Palinarius | Sloop | | Bombay | India | For British East India Company. |
| Unknown date | Pallas | Full-rigged ship | | Rotterdam | Netherlands | For Royal Netherlands Navy. |
| Unknown date | Phaeton | Sloop | John M. & William Gales | Sunderland | United Kingdom | For John M. & William Gales. |
| Unknown date | Phœnix | Brigantine | John Scott & Sons. | Greenock | United Kingdom | For private owner. |
| Unknown date | Pluto | Paddle dredger | Kyd & Co. | Kidderpore | India | For British East Indian Company. |
| Unknown date | Pyramus | Merchantman | Philip Laing | Sunderland | United Kingdom | For Mr. Richardson. |
| Unknown date | Rising Star | Paddle steamer | D. Brent | Rotherhithe | United Kingdom | For T. Cochrane. |
| Unknown date | Royal Sovereign | Paddle steamer | T. Brocklebank | Deptford | United Kingdom | For Eagle & Falcon Steam Packet Company. |
| Unknown date | Rupel | Fourth rate | | Dunkirk | France | For Royal Netherlands Navy. |
| Unknown date | Yorkshireman | Steamship | | Thorne | United Kingdom | For private owner. |
