= Admiral Stopford =

Admiral Stopford may refer to:

- Montagu Stopford (Royal Navy officer) (1798–1864), British Royal Navy vice admiral
- Robert Stopford (Royal Navy officer) (1768–1847), British Royal Navy admiral
- Robert Fanshawe Stopford (1811–1891), British Royal Navy admiral
