= Count of St. Germain =

18th-century European adventurer and intellectual

- Comte de Saint-Germain
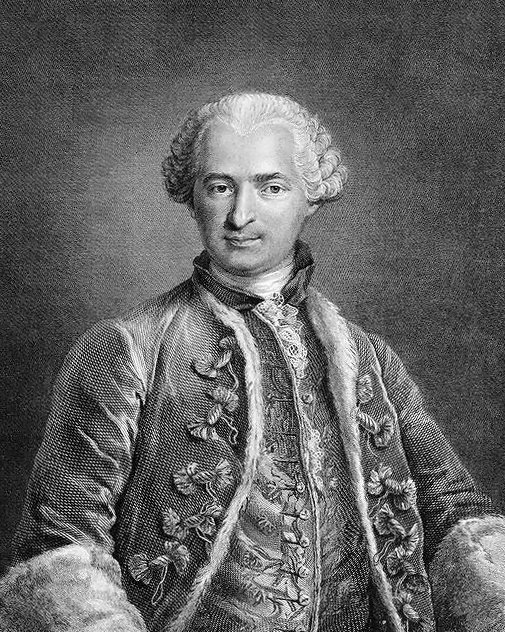
- Engraving by Nicolas Thomas, 1783 (based on a painting then owned by Jeanne Camus de Pontcarré and now lost), contained at the Louvre
- Born: Supposedly 1691 or 1712
- Died: Supposedly 27 February 1784; Eckernförde, Duchy of Schleswig, Denmark
- Other names: Marquess of Montferrat (Fr. Marquis de Montferrat), Count Bellamarre (Fr. Comte Bellamarre), Knight Schoening (Fr. Chavelier Schoening), Count Weldon, Count Soltikoff (Fr. Comte Soltikoff), Manuel Doria, Graf Tzarogy, Prince Ragoczy (Ge. Prinz Ragoczy)

The Count of St. Germain (French: Comte de Saint-Germain; French pronunciation: [kɔ̃t də sɛ̃ ʒɛʁmɛ̃]; 1691 or 1712 – 27 February 1784), whose real name and origins remain unknown, was a European adventurer who had interests and achievements in science, alchemy, philosophy, and the arts. He rose to prominence in the European high society of the mid-18th century due to his works and interests. He associated himself with some of the most prominent figures of the era, including Giacomo Casanova, Voltaire and Wolfgang Amadeus Mozart.

The count used a variety of names and titles, including the Marquess of Montferrat (Fr. Marquis de Montferrat), Count Bellamarre (Fr. Comte Bellamarre), Knight Schoening (Fr. Chevalier Schoening), Count Weldon, Count Soltikoff (Fr. Comte Soltikoff), Manuel Doria, Graf Tzarogy, and Prince Ragoczy (De. Prinz Ragoczy). He appears to have begun to be known under the title of the Count of St Germain during the early 1740s.

He is said to have made far-fetched claims (such as being 500 years old), leading Voltaire to dub him "the Wonderman", and that "he is a man who does not die, and who knows everything".

Note: In this letter dated April 15, 1760, Voltaire addresses the situation of the Comte de St. Germain, who had recently fled to evade an arrest warrant.

Your ministers will certainly have better plans than I do in Breda; the Duke of Choiseul, M. de Kaunitz, and Mr. Pitt do not reveal their secrets to me. It is said that only M. de Saint-Germain knows them – he who once dined in Trent with the fathers of the Council, and who may perhaps have the honor of being received in audience by Your Majesty in about fifty years. He is a man who never dies and who knows everything. As for me, whose career is drawing to its close and who knows nothing, I can only hope that you may know the Duke of Choiseul.

Prince Charles of Hesse-Kassel called him "one of the greatest philosophers who ever lived".

== Origins ==
The count's origins and background remain obscure; nothing is known with certainty of his origins. Toward the end of his life, he claimed to be the son of Francis II Rákóczi, the prince of Transylvania; (Note: Spellings used are those given in The Comte de St. Germain by Isabel Cooper-Oakley) while without hard evidence, this would account for his wealth and evident fine education.

The will of Francis II mentions Leopold George, his eldest son, who was believed to have died at the age of four. It has been speculated that his identity was falsified to protect against persecution from the Habsburgs. At the time of his arrival in Schleswig in 1779, he told Prince Charles of Hesse-Kassel that he was 88 years old, making his year of birth 1691, when Francis II was 15 years old.

St. Germain was supposedly educated in Italy by Gian Gastone, the grand duke of Tuscany and allegedly his mother's brother-in-law. He was believed to be a student at the University of Siena.

Throughout his adult life, he deliberately concealed his actual name and origins, using a multitude of pseudonyms in the different places he visited.

The Marquis de Crequy declared that St. Germain was an Alsatian Jew, Simon Wolff by name, and was born at Strasbourg about the close of the 17th or the beginning of the 18th century; others insist that he was a Spanish Jesuit named Aymar; and others again intimate that his true title was the Marquis de Betmar, and that he was a native of Portugal. The most plausible theory, however, makes him the natural son of an Italian princess and fixes his birth at San Germano, in Savoy, about the year 1710; his ostensible father being one Rotondo, a tax-collector of that district.

— Phineas Taylor Barnum, The Humbugs of the World, 1886.

== Career ==
=== England ===
According to David Hunter, the count contributed some of the songs to L'incostanza delusa, an opera performed at the Haymarket Theatre in London on all but one of the Saturdays from 9 February to 20 April 1745. Later, in a letter of December of that same year, Horace Walpole mentions Count St. Germain as being arrested in London on suspicion of espionage (this was during the Jacobite rebellion of 1745), but released without charge:

The other day they seized an odd man, who goes by the name of Count St. Germain. He has been here these two years, and will not tell who he is, or whence, but professes [two wonderful things, the first] that he does not go by his right name; and the second that he never had any dealings with any woman – nay, nor with any succedaneum [substitute, i.e. for a woman]. He sings, plays on the violin wonderfully, composes, is mad, and not very sensible. He is called an Italian, a Spaniard, a Pole; somebody that married a great fortune in Mexico, and ran away with her jewels to Constantinople; a priest, a fiddler, a vast nobleman. The Prince of Wales has had an unsatiated curiosity about him, but in vain. However, nothing has been made out against him; he is released; and, what convinces me that he is not a gentleman, stays here, and talks of his being taken up for a spy.

The Count gave two private musical performances in London in April and May 1749. On one such occasion, Lady Jemima Yorke described how she was "very much entertain'd by him or at him the whole Time – I mean the Oddness of his Manner which it is impossible not to laugh at, otherwise you know he is very sensible & well-bred in conversation". She continued:

He is an Odd Creature, and the more I see him the more curious I am to know something about him. He is everything with everybody: he talks Ingeniously with Mr Wray, Philosophy with Lord Willoughby, and is gallant with Miss Yorke, Miss Carpenter, and all the Young Ladies. But the Character and Philosopher is what he seems to pretend to, and to be a good deal conceited of: the Others are put on to comply with Les Manieres du Monde, but that you are to suppose his real characteristic; and I can't but fancy he is a great Pretender in All kinds of Science, as well as that he really has acquired an uncommon Share in some.

Walpole reports that St Germain:

spoke Italian and French with the greatest facility, though it was evident that neither was his language; he understood Polish and soon learnt to understand English and talk it a little [...] But Spanish or Portuguese seemed his natural language.

Walpole concludes that the Count was "a man of Quality who had been in or designed for the Church. He was too great a musician not to have been famous if he had not been a gentleman". Walpole describes the Count as pale, with "extremely black" hair and a beard. "He dressed magnificently, [and] had several jewels" and was clearly receiving "large remittances, but made no other figure".

=== France ===
St. Germain appeared in the French court around 1748. In 1749, he was employed by Louis XV for diplomatic missions.

A mime and English comedian known as Mi'Lord Gower impersonated St. Germain in Paris salons. His stories were wilder than the real count's (he had advised Jesus, for example). Inevitably, hearsay of his routine got confused with the original.

Giacomo Casanova describes in his memoirs several meetings with the "celebrated and learned impostor". Of his first meeting, in Paris in 1757, he writes:

The most enjoyable dinner I had was with Madame de Robert Gergi, who came with the famous adventurer, known by the name of the Count de St. Germain. This individual, instead of eating, talked from the beginning of the meal to the end, and I followed his example in one respect as I did not eat, but listened to him with the greatest attention. It may safely be said that as a conversationalist he was unequalled.

St. Germain gave himself out for a marvel and always aimed at exciting amazement, which he often succeeded in doing. He was a scholar, linguist, musician, and chemist, good-looking, and a perfect ladies' man. For a while he gave them paints and cosmetics; he flattered them, not that he would make them young again (which he modestly confessed was beyond him) but that their beauty would be preserved by means of a wash which, he said, cost him a lot of money, but which he gave away freely. He had contrived to gain the favour of Madame de Pompadour, who had spoken about him to the king, for whom he had made a laboratory, in which the monarch – a martyr to boredom – tried to find a little pleasure or distraction, at all events, by making dyes. The king had given him a suite of rooms at Chambord, and a hundred thousand francs for the construction of a laboratory, and according to St. Germain the dyes discovered by the king would have a materially beneficial influence on the quality of French fabrics.

This extraordinary man, intended by nature to be the king of impostors and quacks, would say in an easy, assured manner that he was three hundred years old, that he knew the secret of the Universal Medicine, that he possessed a mastery over nature, that he could melt diamonds, professing himself capable of forming, out of ten or twelve small diamonds, one large one of the finest water without any loss of weight. All this, he said, was a mere trifle to him. Notwithstanding his boastings, his bare-faced lies, and his manifold eccentricities, I cannot say I thought him offensive. In spite of my knowledge of what he was and in spite of my own feelings, I thought him an astonishing man as he was always astonishing me.

=== Dutch Republic ===
In March 1760, at the height of the Seven Years' War, St. Germain travelled to The Hague. In Amsterdam, he stayed at the bankers Adrian and Thomas Hope and pretended he came to borrow money for Louis XV with diamonds as collateral. He assisted Bertrand Philip, Count of Gronsveld starting a porcelain factory in Weesp as furnace and colour specialist. St. Germain attemped to open peace negotiations between Britain and France with the help of Duke Louis Ernest of Brunswick-Lüneburg. British diplomats concluded that St. Germain had the backing of the Duc de Belle-Isle and possibly of Madame de Pompadour, who were trying to outmanoeuvre the French Foreign Minister, the pro-Austrian Duc de Choiseul. However, Britain would not treat with St. Germain unless his credentials came directly from the French king. The Duc de Choiseul convinced Louis XV to disavow St. Germain and demand his arrest. Count Bentinck de Rhoon, a Dutch diplomat, regarded the arrest warrant as internal French politicking, in which Holland should not involve itself. However, a direct refusal to extradite St. Germain was also considered impolitic. De Rhoon, therefore, facilitated the departure of St. Germain to England with a passport issued by the British Ambassador, General Joseph Yorke. This passport was made out "in blank", allowing St. Germain to travel in May 1760 from Hellevoetsluis to London under an assumed name, showing that this practice was officially accepted at the time.

From St. Peterburg, St. Germain travelled to Berlin, Vienna, Milan, Ubbergen, and Zutphen (June 1762), Amsterdam (August 1762), Venice (1769), Livorno (1770), Neurenberg (1772), Mantua (1773), The Hague (1774), and Bad Schwalbach.

== Works ==
=== Known musical works ===
The following list of music attributed to the count comes from Appendix II from Jean Overton Fuller's book The Comte de Saint Germain.

==== Trio Sonatas ====
Six sonatas for two violins with a bass for harpsichord or violoncello:

- Op. 47 I. F major, 4/4, Molto adagio
- Op. 48 II. B♭ major, 4/4, Allegro
- Op. 49 III. E♭ major, 4/4, Adagio
- Op. 50 IV. G minor, 4/4, Tempo giusto
- Op. 51 V. G major, 4/4, Moderato
- Op. 52 VI. A major, 3/4, Cantabile lento

==== Violin solos ====
Seven solos for solo violin:

- Op. 53 I. B♭ major, 4/4, Largo
- Op. 54 II. E major, 4/4, Adagio
- Op. 55 III. C minor, 4/4, Adagio
- Op. 56 IV. E♭ major, 4/4, Adagio
- Op. 57 V. E♭ major, 4/4, Adagio
- Op. 58 VI. A major, 4/4, Adagio
- Op. 59 VII. B♭ major, 4/4, Adagio

==== English songs ====
- Op. 4 The Maid That's Made for Love and Me (O Wouldst Thou Know What Sacred Charms). E♭ major (marked B♭ major), 3/4
- Op. 5 It Is Not that I Love You Less. F major, 3/4
- Op. 6 Gentle Love, This Hour Befriend Me. D major, 4/4
- Op. 7 Jove, When He Saw My Fanny's Face. D major, 3/4

==== Italian arias ====
Numbered in order of their appearance in the Musique Raisonnee, with their page numbers in that volume.

* An asterisk marks titles performed in L'Incostanza Delusa and published in the book of Favourite Songs from that opera.

- Op. 1 IV, pp. 16–20. Senza pietà mi credi,* G major, 6/8 (marked 3/8 but there are 6 quavers to the bar)
- Op. 2 VIII, pp. 36–39. Digli, digli,* D major, 3/4
- Op. 3 IX, pp. 40–45. Per pieta bel Idol mio,* F major, 3/8
- Op. 4/17 XIII, pp. 58–61. Se mai riviene, D minor, 3/4
- Op. 8 I, pp. 1–5. Padre perdona, oh! pene, G minor, 4/4
- Op. 9 II, pp. 6–10. Non piangete amarti, E major, 4/4
- Op. 10 III, pp. 11–15. Intendo il tuo, F major, 4/4
- Op. 11 V, pp. 21–26. Già, già che moria deggio, D major, 4/4
- Op. 12 VI, pp. 27–31. Dille che l'amor mio,* E major, 4/4
- Op. 13 VII, pp. 32–35. Mio ben ricordati, D major, 3/4
- Op. 14 X, pp. 46–50. Non so, quel dolce moto, B♭ major, 4/4
- Op. 15 XI, pp. 51–55. Piango, è ver; ma non-procede, G minor, 4/4
- Op. 16 XII, pp. 56–57. Dal labbro che t'accende, E major, 3/4
- Op. 18 XIV, pp. 62–63. Parlerò; non-e permesso, E major, 4/4
- Op. 19 XV, pp. 64–65. Se tutti i miei pensieri, A major, 4/4
- Op. 20 XVI, pp. 66–67. Guadarlo, guaralo in volto, E major, 3/4
- Op. 21 XVII, pp. 68–69. Oh Dio mancarmi, D major, 4/4
- Op. 22 XVIII, pp. 70–71. Digli che son fedele, E♭ major, 3/4
- Op. 23 XIX, pp. 72–73. Pensa che sei cruda, E minor, 4/4
- Op. 24 XX, pp. 74–75. Torna torna innocente, G major, 3/8
- Op. 25 XXI, pp. 76–77. Un certo non-so che veggo, E major, 4/4
- Op. 26 XXII, pp. 78–79. Guardami, guardami prima in volto, D major, 4/4
- Op. 27 XXIII, pp. 80–81. Parto, se vuoi così, E♭ major, 4/4
- Op. 28 XXIV, pp. 82–83. Volga al Ciel se ti, D minor, 3/4
- Op. 29 XXV, pp. 84–85. Guarda se in questa volta, F major, 4/4
- Op. 30 XXVI, pp. 86–87. Quanto mai felice, D major, 3/4
- Op. 31 XXVII, pp. 88–89. Ah che neldi'sti, D major, 4/4
- Op. 32, XXVIII, pp. 90–91. Dopp'un tuo Sguardo, F major, 3/4
- Op. 33 XXIX, pp. 92–93. Serberò fra' Ceppi, G major, 4/4
- Op. 34 XXX, pp. 94–95. Figlio se più non-vivi moro, F major, 4/4
- Op. 35 XXXI, pp. 96–98. Non ti respondo, C major, 3/4
- Op. 36 XXXII, pp. 99–101. Povero cor perché palpito, G major, 3/4
- Op. 37 XXXIII, pp. 102–105. Non v'è più barbaro, C minor, 3/8
- Op. 38 XXXIV, pp. 106–108. Se de' tuoi lumi al fuoco amor, E major, 4/4
- Op. 39 XXXV, pp. 109–111. Se tutto tosto me sdegno, E major, 4/4
- Op. 40 XXXVI, pp. 112–115. Ai negli occhi un tel incanto, D major, 4/4 (marked 2/4 but there are 4 crotchets to the bar)
- Op. 41 XXXVII, pp. 116–118. Come poteste de Dio, F major, 4/4
- Op. 42 XXXVIII, pp. 119–121. Che sorte crudele, G major, 4/4
- Op. 43 XXXIX, pp. 122–124. Se almen potesse al pianto, G minor, 4/4
- Op. 44 XXXX, pp. 125–127. Se viver non-posso lunghi, D major, 3/8
- Op. 45 XXXXI, pp. 128–130. Fedel faro faro cara cara, D major, 3/4
- Op. 46 XXXXII, p. 131. Non ha ragione, F major, 4/4

=== Literary works ===
Discounting the snippets of political intrigue, a few musical pieces, and one mystical poem, there are only two pieces of writing attributed to the Count: La Très Sainte Trinosophie and the untitled The Triangular Book of St. Germain (The Triangular Manuscript).

The first book attributed to the Count of Saint Germain is La Très Sainte Trinosophie, a beautifully illustrated 18th century manuscript that describes in symbolic terms a journey of spiritual initiation or an alchemical process, depending on the interpretation. This book has been published several times, most notably by Manly P. Hall, in Los Angeles, California, in 1933. The attribution to St. Germain rests on a handwritten note scrawled inside the cover of the original manuscript stating that this was a copy of a text once in St. Germain's possession. However, despite Hall's elaborate introduction describing the Count's legend, The Most Holy Trinosophia shows no definitive connection to him.

The second work attributed to St. Germain is the untitled 18th century manuscript in the shape of a triangle, written in french cyphered letters as symbols. The two known copies of the Triangular Manuscript exist as Hogart Manuscript 209 and 210 (MS 209 and MS 210). Both currently reside in the Manly Palmer Hall Collection of Alchemical Manuscripts at the Getty Research Library. Nick Koss decoded and translated this manuscript in 2011 and it was published as The Triangular Book of St. Germain by Ouroboros Press in 2015. Unlike the first work, it mentions St. Germain directly as its originator. The book describes a magical ritual by which one can perform the two most extraordinary feats that characterized the legend of Count of St. Germain, namely procurement of great wealth and extension of life.

== Final days ==
The count arrived in Altona, Schleswig, in 1779, where he made an acquaintance with Prince Charles of Hesse-Kassel, both of whom had an interest in mysticism. Charles was a member of several secret societies including the Bavarian Illuminati and a Secret Society of Freesmiths. The count showed Charles several of his gems and convinced him that he had invented a new method of colouring cloth. Charles, impressed, installed the count in an abandoned factory at Eckernförde which Charles had acquired especially for the count, and supplied the count with the materials and cloths needed to proceed with the project. The two met frequently in the following years, and Charles outfitted a laboratory for alchemical experiments in his nearby summer residence Louisenlund, where they, among other things, cooperated in creating gemstones and jewelry. Charles later recounts in a letter that he was the only person in whom the count truly confided. The count told Charles that he was the son of Francis II Rákóczi, and that he had been 88 years of age when he arrived in Schleswig.

=== Death ===
The count died in his private residence in the factory on 27 February 1784 when Charles was staying in Kassel. The death was recorded in the register of the St. Nicolai Church (De. St. Nicolaikirche) in Eckernförde. He was buried on 2 March at Eckernförde in a private grave, the cost of which was listed in the accounting books of the church the following day. On 3 April, a little over a month after his death, the mayor and the city council of Eckernförde issued an official proclamation about the auctioning off of the count's remaining effects in case no living relative would appear within a designated time period to lay claim on them.

Charles donated the factory to the crown and it was afterward converted into a hospital.

Jean Fuller, during her research in 1988, found that the count's estate upon his death was a packet of paid bills, receipts, and quittances; 82 Reichsthalers and 13 shillings in cash; and 29 various groups of items of clothing (gloves, stockings, trousers, shirts, etc.), 14 linen shirts, eight other groups of linen items, and various sundries: razors, buckles, toothbrushes, sunglasses, combs, etc. No diamonds, jewels, gold, or any other riches were listed, nor were kept cultural items from travels, personal items (like his violin), or any notes of correspondence.

== Legacy ==
In various Theosophical and post-Theosophical teachings, the Count of St. Germain is seen as a supernatural being called a Master of the Ancient Wisdom or an Ascended master, who is responsible for ushering in the Age of Aquarius. Several of these sects refer to him as "Master Rakoczi" or "Master R." Some write that the name St. Germain invented for himself was a French version of the Latin Sanctus Germanus, meaning "Holy Brother".

Saint Germain is associated with the color violet, the gemstone amethyst, and the Maltese cross rendered in violet (usually the iron cross style cross patee version). He is also regarded as the "Chohan of the Seventh Ray".

=== Theosophical Society ===
In 1892, Helena Blavatsky, a Thesophist characterised the Count of St. Germain as "the greatest Oriental Adept Europe has seen during the last centuries." She said that he was one of her Masters of Wisdom and hinted that he had given her secret documents. The Theosophical Society after Blavatsky's death considered him to be a Mahatma, Master of the Ancient Wisdom, or Adept.

According to the Theosophical Society, the Seven Rays are seven metaphysical principles that govern both individual souls and the unfolding of each 2,158-year-long Astrological Age. Since, according to Theosophy, the upcoming Age of Aquarius will be governed by the Seventh (Violet) Ray (the Ray of Ceremonial Order), Saint Germain is sometimes called "The Hierarch of the Age of Aquarius".

Annie Besant said that she met the Count in 1896. C. W. Leadbeater claimed to have met him in Rome. According to Leadbeater, the count had brown eyes, olive colored skin, and a pointed beard, adding "the splendour of his Presence impels men to make obeisance". Elsewhere, he described the count as wearing "a suit of golden chain-mail which once belonged to a Roman Emperor; over it is thrown a magnificent cloak of crimson, with on its clasp a seven-pointed star in diamond and amethyst, and sometimes he wears a glorious robe of violet."

=== "I AM" Activity ===
Guy Ballard claimed that, in August 1930, he met the Count of Saint Germain on Mount Shasta in California. Shortly thereafter, Ballard founded the "I AM" Activity, and later the Saint Germain Foundation to serve as its parent organization. The "I AM" movement originated the presentation of the count as an Ascended Master, referred to simply as "Saint Germain." In the Ascended Master teachings, the names "Master Rakoczi" and "Master R" refer to a being distinct from Saint Germain, the Great Divine Director, who is Saint Germain's teacher in the Great White Brotherhood of Ascended Masters.

Saint Germain is the central figure in a series of books published by the Saint Germain Press (the publishing arm of the Saint Germain Foundation). The first two volumes, Unveiled Mysteries and The Magic Presence, written by Guy Ballard as "Godfré Ray King", describe Saint Germain as an Ascended master, like Jesus, who is assisting humanity. In these first two books, Ballard discusses his personal experiences with Saint Germain and reveals many teachings that are in harmony with Theosophy. The third volume, The 'I AM' Discourses, contains material that is foundational to the sacred scriptures of the "I AM" Religious Activity, founded in 1930 – the first of the Ascended Master Teachings religions.

There are 20 volumes in the Saint Germain Series of Books, which are also referred to as the "Green Books". Another significant work, the Comte de Gabalis, is said to be from the hand of Sir Francis Bacon before he Ascended and returned as Sanctus Germanus or Saint Germain. First printed in 1670, the book includes a picture of the Polish Rider, Rembrandt's famous painting at the Frick Collection in New York City, which is said to be of Sir Francis Bacon, AKA the Comte de Gabalis, or the Count of the Cabala. Lotus Ray King (Edna Ballard's pen name), wife of Guy Ballard, talked about this book having been authored by the Ascended Master Saint Germain in the Round Table Talks of the "I AM" Religious Activity.

As an Ascended Master, Saint Germain is believed to have many magical powers such as the ability to teleport, levitate, walk through walls, and to inspire people by telepathy, among others. Saint Germain is "The God of Freedom for this system of worlds". Ascended Master Saint Germain became the Hierarch of the Age of Aquarius on 1 July 1956, replacing the Ascended Master Jesus, who had been for almost 2,000 years the "Hierarch of the Age of Pisces".

=== Alice Bailey ===
In the works of Alice Bailey, Saint Germain is called "Master Rakoczi" or the "Master R." Bailey likened Master Rakoczi to "the General Manager for the carrying out of the plans of the executive council of the Christ." In preparation for the return of Christ Master R. plays the role of the Lord of Civilization, and his task is the establishment of the new civilization. He is said to telepathically influence people who are seen by him as being instrumental in bringing about the new civilization of the Age of Aquarius.

=== Previous incarnations ===
Certain Theosophical sects differ on the count's past lives, but generally agree upon Saint Alban, Proclus, Roger Bacon, and Sir Francis Bacon.

Esotericist Raymond Bernard went further, claiming that the count was born Francis Tudor, the secret son of Queen Elizabeth I and Lord Dudley, who was raised as Francis Bacon. In this manner Bernard gave the count direct credit, as Bacon, for writing the works of Shakespeare, Christopher Marlowe, Edmund Spenser, and Miguel de Cervantes. Since Bernard identified Bernard as Christian Rosenkreuz and claimed that Masonic symbolism appears in Shakespeare's plays, he also effectively asserted that the Count of St. Germain was the founder of both Rosicrucianism and Freemasonry. Bernard rejected the idea that Bacon was reincarnated as the count, instead suggesting that Bacon simply feigned his death and developed the Count of St. Germain as a new identity.

According to Mark Prophet, Francis Bacon faked his own death on Easter Sunday, 9 April 1626, and even attended his own funeral in disguise. It is believed by the adherents of the Ascended Master Teachings that he then traveled secretly to Transylvania (then part of Hungary, now part of Romania) to the Rakoczy Mansion of the noble family of Hungary. Finally, on 1 May 1684, he is believed to have attained (by his knowledge of alchemy) his physical Ascension (attaining immortality and eternal youth – the sixth level of Initiation), at which time Francis Bacon adopted the name "Saint Germain".

=== Skeptical view ===
The scholar K. Paul Johnson maintains that the "Masters" that Madame Blavatsky wrote about and produced letters from were actually idealizations of people who were her mentors.

In his 1980 New York Times article "Talking to the Dead and Other Amusements", Paul Zweig maintains that Madame Blavatsky's revelations were fraudulent.

=== Use of the name ===
A number of books on palmistry, hypnotism, and related subjects were published in the United States under the pseudonym "Comte C. de Saint-Germain" at the turn of the 20th century. These were authored by a journalist Edgar de Valcourt-Vermont, who wrote a palmistry column for The Chicago Times.

== See also ==
- Occult theories about Francis Bacon
- Richard Chanfray
- Shakespeare authorship question
