= Thomas Edwards (critic) =

English critic and poet

Thomas Edwards (1699–1757) was an English critic and poet, best known for a controversy with William Warburton, over the latter's editing of Shakespeare.

== Life ==
Edwards was born in 1699. His father and grandfather had both been barristers, and he is generally believed to have been privately educated before entering Lincoln's Inn, although according to an article in the Gentleman's Magazine he was educated at Eton and at King's College Cambridge, and later served in the army. He did little work as a lawyer, discouraged by what some accounts describe as "a considerable hesitation in his speech", turning instead to literature

His father died when Edwards was still quite young, and a sonnet "upon a family picture" indicates that his brother and sisters all predeceased him. He inherited an estate at Pitshanger, Middlesex where he lived until buying, in 1739, another at Turrick, Ellesborough, Buckinghamshire, where he spent the rest of his life. He was elected Fellow of the Society of Antiquaries 20 October 1745.

He died on 3 January 1757 while visiting Samuel Richardson at Parson's Green, and was buried in Ellesborough churchyard, with a lengthy epitaph, which describes him as "in his Poetry simple, elegant, pathetic; in his Criticism exact, acute, temperate".

== Writings ==
=== Dispute with William Warburton ===
Edwards' first published work, a pamphlet entitled A Letter to the Author of a late Epistolary Dedication addressed to Mr. Warburton (1744), was an attack on William Warburton, a priest and literary scholar, later to be ordained bishop of Gloucester.

In 1747, Warburton published a new edition of Shakespeare. In his preface he hinted that he had originally intended to include a set of canons for literary criticism, but now referred his readers to the occasional comments on the subject he made in the course of his annotations. In response, Edwards published a "Supplement", in which he satirically remedied the omission by providing an intentionally absurd code of criticism, illustrated with examples from Warburton's notes.

Warburton retorted by appending a note referring to Edwards to a line in a new edition of Alexander Pope's Dunciad, referring to him as "a gentleman, as he is pleased to call himself, of Lincoln's Inn; but, in reality, a gentleman only of the Dunciad", who "with the wit and learning of his ancestor Tom Thimble in The Rehearsal, and with the air of good-nature and politeness of Caliban in The Tempest, hath now happily finished the Dunce's progress, in personal abuse". Edwards replied indignantly in a preface to later editions of the Supplement. Warburton denied having attacked Edwards's breeding, but in offensive terms. Other opponents of Warburton sympathised with Edwards, and Mark Akenside addressed an ode to him upon the occasion.

The Supplement reached a third edition in 1748, under the title of The Canons of Criticism, and a Glossary, being a Supplement to Mr. Warburton's edition of Shakspear, collected from the Notes in that celebrated work and proper to be bound up with it. By the other Gentleman of Lincoln's Inn, the first "Gentleman of Lincoln's Inn" being Philip Carteret Webb, who published a pamphlet under that name in 1742. Samuel Johnson thought that Edwards made some good hits, but compares him to a fly stinging a horse; Thomas Warton thought Edwards's assault judicious.

=== Other writings ===
Edwards was a writer of sonnets, of which about fifty are collected in later editions of the Canons of Criticism, many from Dodsley's and Pearch's collections. They are modelled on those of John Milton.

Edwards had a large number of literary friends, with whom he kept up correspondence. Among them were Richard Owen Cambridge, Thomas Birch, Isaac Hawkins Browne, Arthur and George Onslow, Daniel Wray, and Samuel Richardson. Many of his letters are printed in the third volume of Richardson's correspondence. Six volumes of copies of his letters now in the Bodleian Library include these, with unpublished letters to Richardson, John Wilkes, and others. Richard Roderick was another friend, who helped him in the Canons of Criticism.

To the Canons of Criticism (1758) is annexed an Account of the Trial of the letter y, alias Y. He also wrote a tract, published after his death, called Free and Candid Thoughts on the Doctrine of Predestination (1761).
