= HMS Zebra (1815) =

Brig-sloop of the Royal Navy

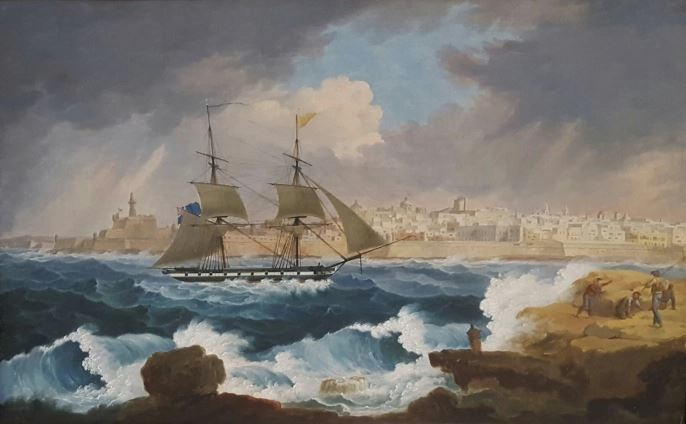
- HMS Zebra entering Marsamxett Harbour, Malta

History

United Kingdom
- Name: HMS Zebra
- Ordered: 2 October 1812
- Builder: Bombay Dockyard; master shipwright Jamsetjee Bomanjee Wadia
- Laid down: 9 November 1814
- Launched: 18 December 1815
- Fate: Wrecked, 2 December 1840

General characteristics
- Class & type: Cruizer-class brig-sloop
- Tons burthen: 385 15/94 (bm)
- Length: 100 ft 3 in (30.6 m) (overall); 77 ft 5 in (23.6 m) (keel)
- Beam: 30 ft 7 in (9.3 m)
- Depth of hold: 12 ft 9 in (3.9 m)
- Complement: 121
- Armament: 16 × 32-pounder carronades + 2 × 6-pounder chase guns

HMS Zebra, was an 18-gun Cruizer-class brig-sloop of the Royal Navy. She was built of teak in the East India Company's Bombay Dockyard and launched in 1815 as the last of her class. She chased pirates in the Mediterranean, just missed the Battle of Navarino, sailed to East Indies, where she almost foundered, and on to Australia, chased Malay pirates, and was wrecked in 1840 during the Syrian War.

== Service ==
Commander Robert Forbes commissioned Zebra in December 1815 to sail her to England. However, Philip Henry Bridges was acting commander of Zebra from December 1815 to November 1816, when he was promoted into Challenger. In May 1816, she arrived in Madras from Calcutta, and on 28 July 1816 she was at Simon's Bay where a terrible hurricane stranded and almost destroyed her and the frigate HMS Révolutionnaire. By 14 December 1816, she had reached Portsmouth. There she was paid off into ordinary, where she stayed until 1825. In February 1825, she was recommissioned for the Mediterranean under Commander Edward R. Williams, and sailed in May.

=== Mediterranean pirates ===
On 6 January 1827, Zebra left for the Mediterranean. She arrived in Zante on 28 January 1827 carrying dispatches from Captain Gawen William Hamilton of Cambrian for Captain Irby of Pelican. At Zante Williams learned that the governor of Maina – Giovanni Mavromicali – had not fulfilled his pledge to bring his galliot and an Ionian prize to Zante to have their papers checked. Irby had warned Mavromicali that should the papers not be in order the British would seize both vessels, and should Mavromicali fail to comply, he should send his women and children into the mountains as the Royal Navy would be compelled to destroy his houses. Williams sailed on 30 January in search of Mavromicali.

On 4 February, Zebra's boats brought out from the port of Catecali a small local sailing boat belonging to the pirate Nicolo Cipriotti, which they burnt. The boats also rescued an Ionian trabaccolo that Cipriotti had seized.

The boats continued their search for Mavromicali's galley along the shore towards Cape Kitries. On 8 February, near Scardamoula, they sighted a vessel that appeared to be their quarry, but were unable to catch it before it took refuge in a port. Williams sent all his boats into the port to demand that the surrender of the galliot. The boats then left, having received a promise that Mavromicali would sail to Zante or Napoli di Romania the following morning. Not trusting Mavromicali's word, Zebra anchored only 300 yards from the galliot. When Williams tried to send a further message to Mavromicali, the emissaries were rebuffed and although Williams wanted to respond by seizing the galliot the seas were too rough. In the morning, Williams saw that the hills were ringed with armed men and when the British reminded Mavromicali of his agreement, the Governor made no reply. Eventually Zebra fired a carronade at the bow of the galley, dismounting one of the galliot's four guns. (Note: The galliot carried two long 12-pounders and two 6-pounders.) Mavromicalli agreed to give up his ship and the British then seized her. Zebra sailed on 10 February with her capture and arrived in Zante on the next evening.

On 4 March 1827 Zebra became becalmed off Zea. While there, she observed two boats full of men leaving the island. Zebra sent her own boats in pursuit. One fleeing boat ran ashore and all but four men fled ashore; the British then burned it. The following night as Zebra sailed through the Doro Passage, five boats harried her, firing on her. They then disappeared into the dark when Zebra tried to bring her guns to bear.

Williams received promotion to captain in April, and Charles Cotton replaced him in May. Zebra operated out of Malta, protecting British trade in the Greek Archipelago, at Alexandria, and around the coasts of Syria and Caramania.

The schooner Robert, Thomas Simson, master, sailed from Messina for Smyrna on 17 July. On the evening of 23 July, two boats fired on Robert while she was in mid channel between Serpho and Sepanto. About 100 pirates then boarded Robert, taking her cargo and the crew's clothes and possessions. The pirates left at daybreak when a convoy came in sight. Robert approached the convoy and notified Zebra, which was escorting the convoy. Robert accompanied the convoy to Milo and then joined a French convoy to Smyrna.

=== Navarino ===
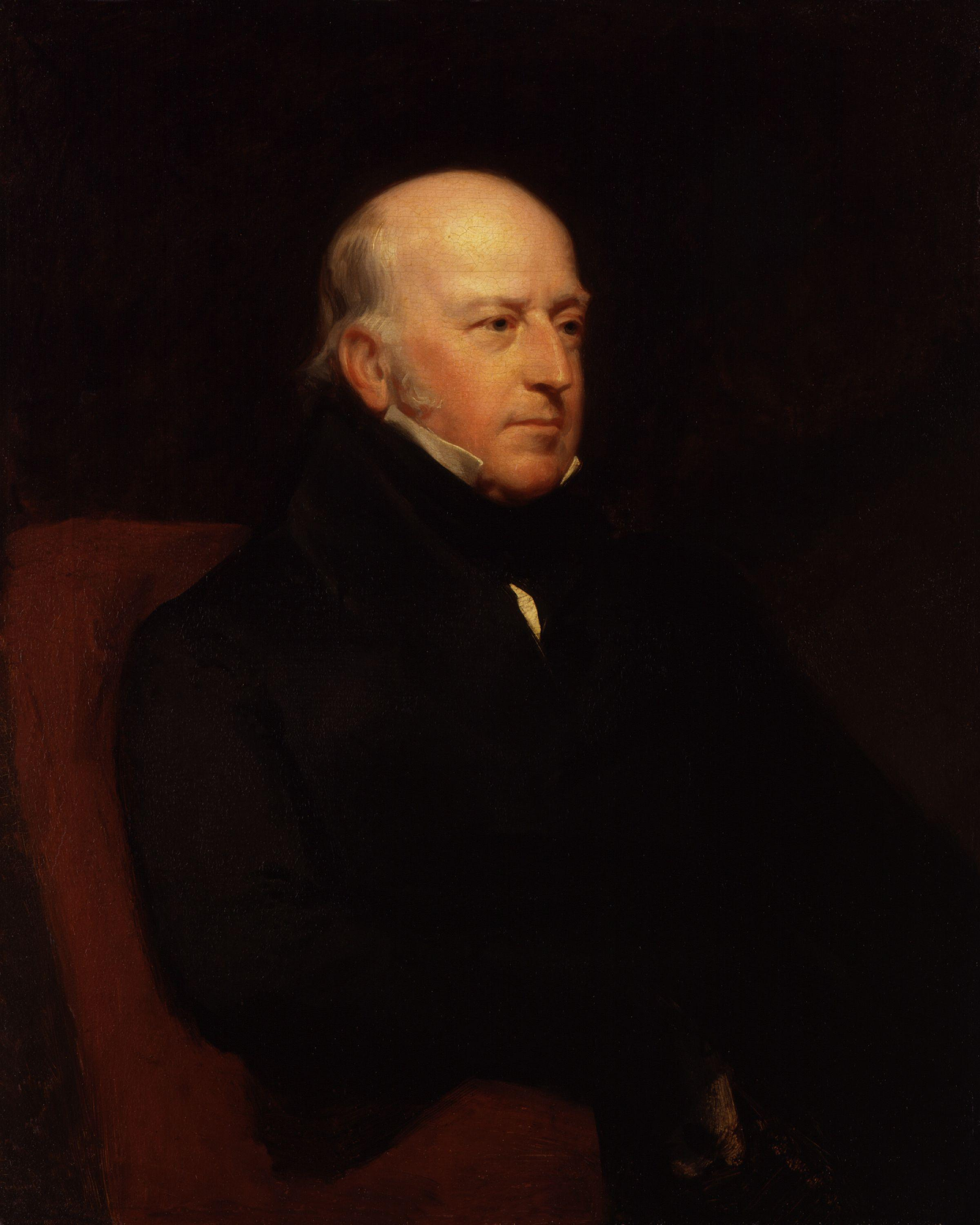
Painting of Sir Edward Codrington

In October, Zebra joined Admiral Sir Edward Codrington in Asia — together with Talbot and Dartmouth — in search of a force of Turkish vessels that Dartmouth reported had left Navarin or Navarino and were heading to Patras. Codrington's small squadron intercepted the Ottoman fleet and forced it to return to Navarino. In this, Zebra played a striking role by firing across the bow of an 80-gun Ottoman ship of the line.

Eventually Codrington — joined by more British vessels, together with a number of French and Russian ones — inflicted a massive defeat on the Ottoman fleet at the Battle of Navarino on 27 October. Zebra missed the battle, Codrington having sent her to get assistance.

Cotton died on board Zebra of a fever on 11 February 1828 and she came under the temporary command of her lieutenant, Wheatley. Cotton was believed to have developed the fever as a consequence of his exertions on 31 January in rescuing the crew of Cambrian off Carabusa (Gramvousa) on Candia. Sir Thomas Staines had taken a small squadron to the island off Cape Busa (Vouxa) to deal with a nest of Greek pirates that had made the harbour there their home after the Greeks had taken possession of it early in the war against the Turks in Crete. The squadron consisted of Cambrian, Pelican, Isis, Rattlesnake, Zebra, Cameleon and two French corvettes. In the port there were 14 Greek vessels, together with an Austrian and an Ionian merchantmen that the pirates had taken. After the pirates had refused to surrender, the squadron opened fire and destroyed a number of the vessels. Marines from Pelican and Isis then landed to take possession of the fortress there. However, as the squadron left, Isis struck Cambrian, causing her to broadside the rocks in the narrow channel. The strong swell then broke up Cambrian. (Note: A first-class share of the prize money for the goods captured from the pirates was worth £15 18s 11 1/4d; a sixth-class share was worth 4s 9 3/4.)

Commander Edmund W. Gilbert replaced Wheatley in October 1828.

=== East Indies and Australia ===
In January 1829, Commander Richard Pridham took command of Zebra and sailed her to the East Indies. Commander Durrell de Sausmarez was appointed to command in July, assumed command in November, and sailed her to Port Jackson. However, he left Zebra in February 1832 due to ill-health, returning home in the whaler Strathfieldsaye.

In September 1831, Zebra was at the Bay of Islands in response to a rumour that a French man-o-war was expected, with the suspected intention of annexing New Zealand.

In 1832, Zebra was at Port Taranaki in response to a report that the Māori there were planning to attack settlers. When she arrived it turned out there was no unrest so she continued on to Kapiti, and then on through Cook's Straits to Tahiti.

In May, Zebra was at Keppel's Island. There she found William Brown, J. Roberts (a negro), and all survivors of Port au Prince. Brown or Roberts was serving as the interpreter for the king there.

In August 1832 Lord Frederick Beauclerk (Acting) took command and paid Zebra off in Spring 1833.

Between February and September 1834, Zebra was at Chatham, fitting out. R. C. M'Crea assumed command in June and sailed for the East Indies on 24 September.

On 21 August 1835, Zebra was on her way from the Cocos (Keeling) Islands to the Swan River and 100 mi (160 km) west-south-west of Naturalite Bay when a strong squall threw the brig on its beam ends. Fortunately a port swung open, allowing the immense amount of water covering the weather coamings to escape, enabling her to right herself. The waves also threw two guns overboard; later M'Crae threw another two overboard as well to lighten Zebra. The bad weather continued, and on 27 August M'Crae threw the remaining eight cannon overboard. Two days later she reached Rottenest Island and eventually Fremantle. On 18 September 1834 he sailed for the Cape of Good Hope.

On the evening of 17 September 1836, Zebra on her way from Sydney to India when she anchored in Port Molle. Her sailing master, Lucius C. Bailey, gave a detailed description of its appeal as an anchorage. The next day, M'Crea examined Long Island Sound, finding it a good anchorage and an alternative to Port Molle if the winds blew strong from the north. They also remarked on the remains of the Valetta, which had wrecked there in 1825, and on a well the survivors had dug.

In 1837, M'Crae and Zebra engaged with Malay pirates. The East India Company awarded him a plate worth 100 guineas as a measure of their appreciation for his efforts. Zebra remained in the East Indies until early 1838 when she was ordered home.

=== Mediterranean ===
On 3 January 1839, Robert Fanshawe Stopford assumed command and sailed her to the Mediterranean. During Muhammad Ali's revolt against the Ottoman Sultan and Ali's subsequent invasion of Syria in what became known as the Oriental Crisis of 1840 or the Syrian War, Zebra served with the naval force in the Eastern Mediterranean under Charles Napier.

On 23 February 1840, Commander James John Stopford assumed command. On 5 May 1840, Zebra was in Malta for repairs. En route for Corfu, she had knocked off part of her false keel at Cape Blanco. (Note: This is possibly Ras al-Abyad, about a kilometer from Ras ben Sakka in Tunisia. However, Ras al-Abyad is west of Malta while Corfu is east.) On 19 July Zebra joined the first rate Princess Charlotte, the third rate Benbow, and the corvette Daphne in sailing for the Syrian coast. By 8 September, Zebra had sailed with Admiral Sir Robert Stopford's fleet from Alexandria, which arrived at Beirut three days later. On 12 September her marines participated in the unsuccessful attack on the fortress at Gebail (Byblos) during which one of them was killed.

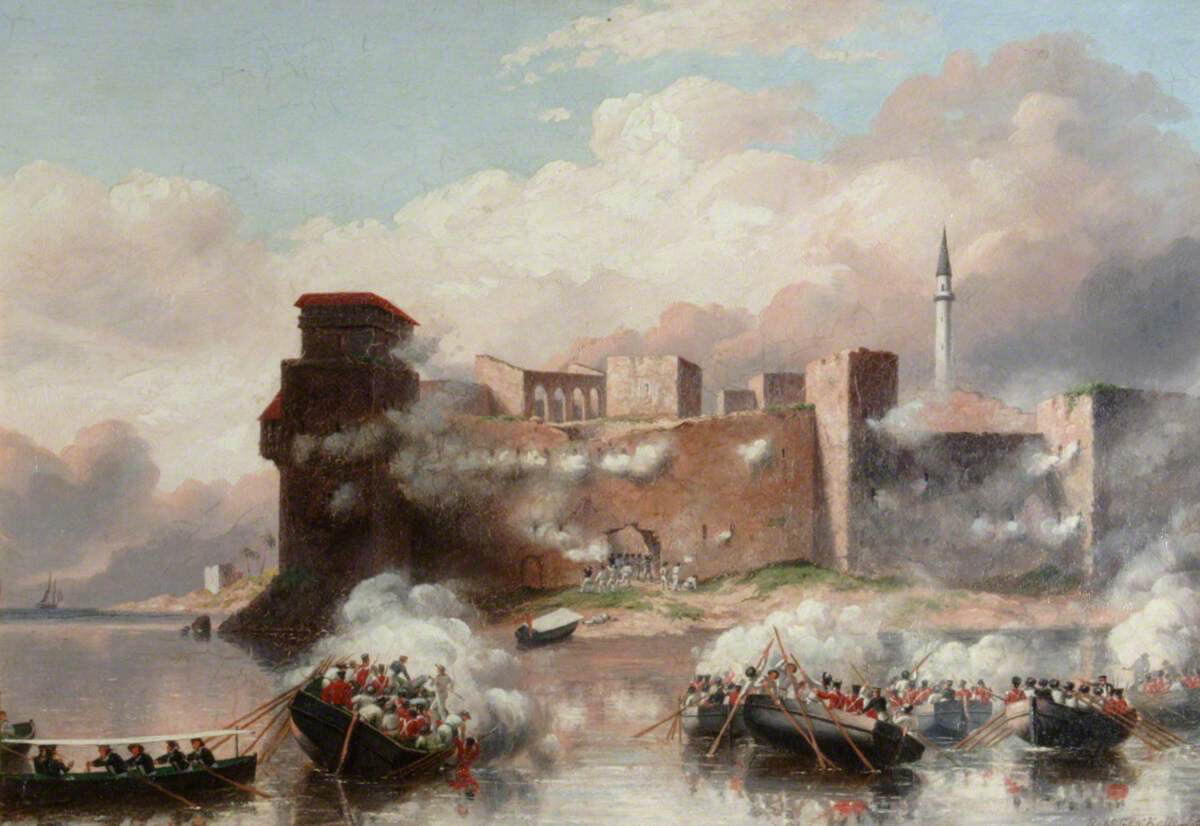
The Boats of HM frigates Carysfort and Zebra with 50 Royal Marines, commanded by Lieut. R. H. Harrison, Royal Marines, attacking the castle of Tortosa, 25 September 1840

On 26 September 1840, Zebra joined Benbow and the sixth rate Carysfort to cover an attack on Tortosa. The boats carrying the landing party grounded on a reef while under fire. The boats of the landing party could not get off before the landing party had suffered eight killed and eighteen wounded. This attack too was essentially unsuccessful, with Zebra suffering three or four men wounded.

Zebra was present at the capture of Acre and operated on the coast of Syria. The Navy awarded the Turkish Medal to participants in the campaign. (Note: Officers ranking with field officers received gold medals, quarterdeck and warrant officers received silver medals, and working petty officers, seamen, marines and boys received copper medals.) On 16 October 1844, Parliament voted a grant to those on board the Royal Navy fleet from 9 September to 10 October 1840 and at the bombardment on 3 November of St Jean D'Acre. (Note: The grant money was payable on 16 October 1844. Commanders such as Stopford were due £67 17s for the campaign and £86 19s 7d for the bombardment. Awardees of the seventh class, landsmen, the next to the lowest, were due 13s 7d and 17s 2 1/4d.)

== Fate ==
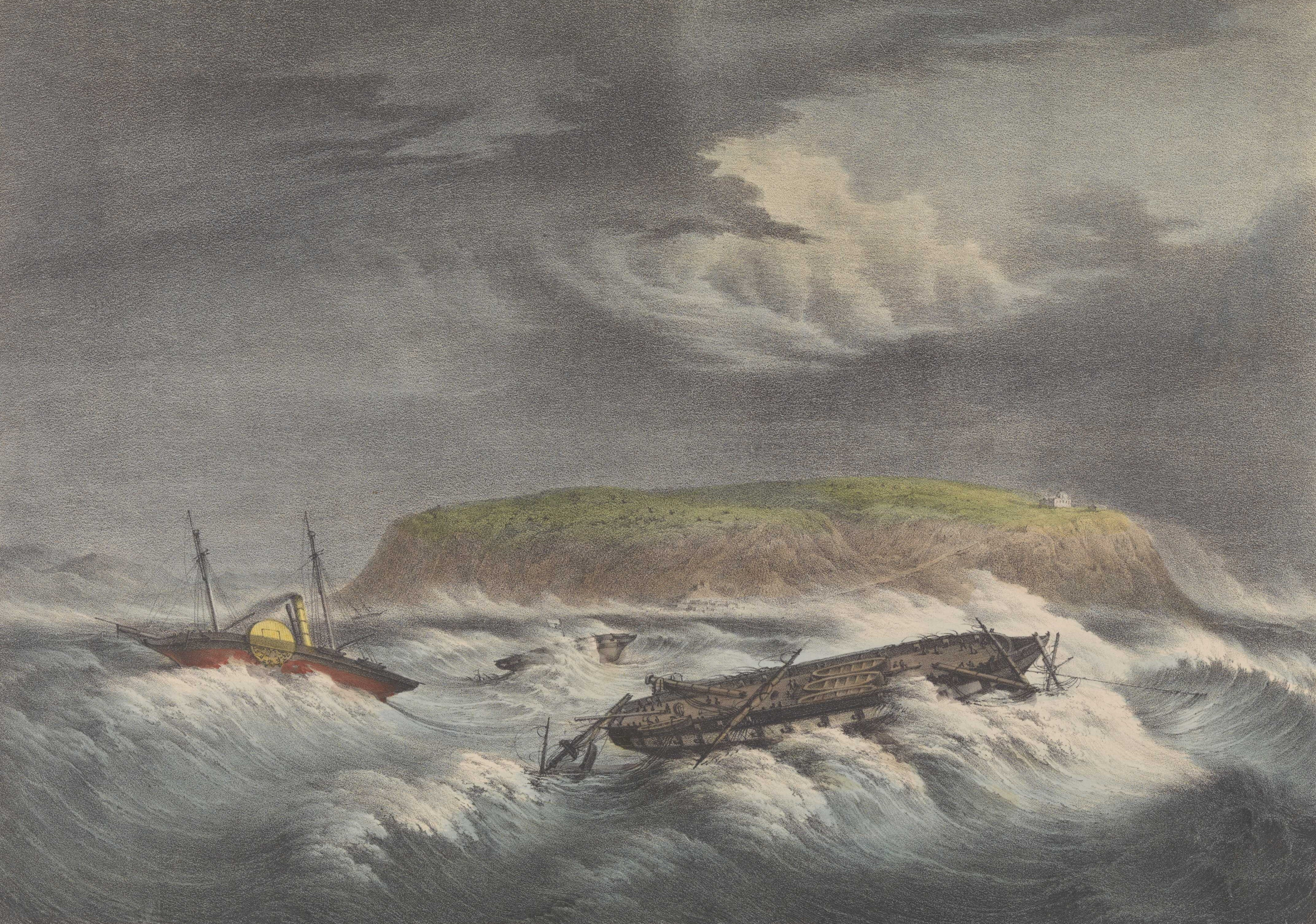
From left:HMS Vesuvius, Zebra, and Pique during the storm

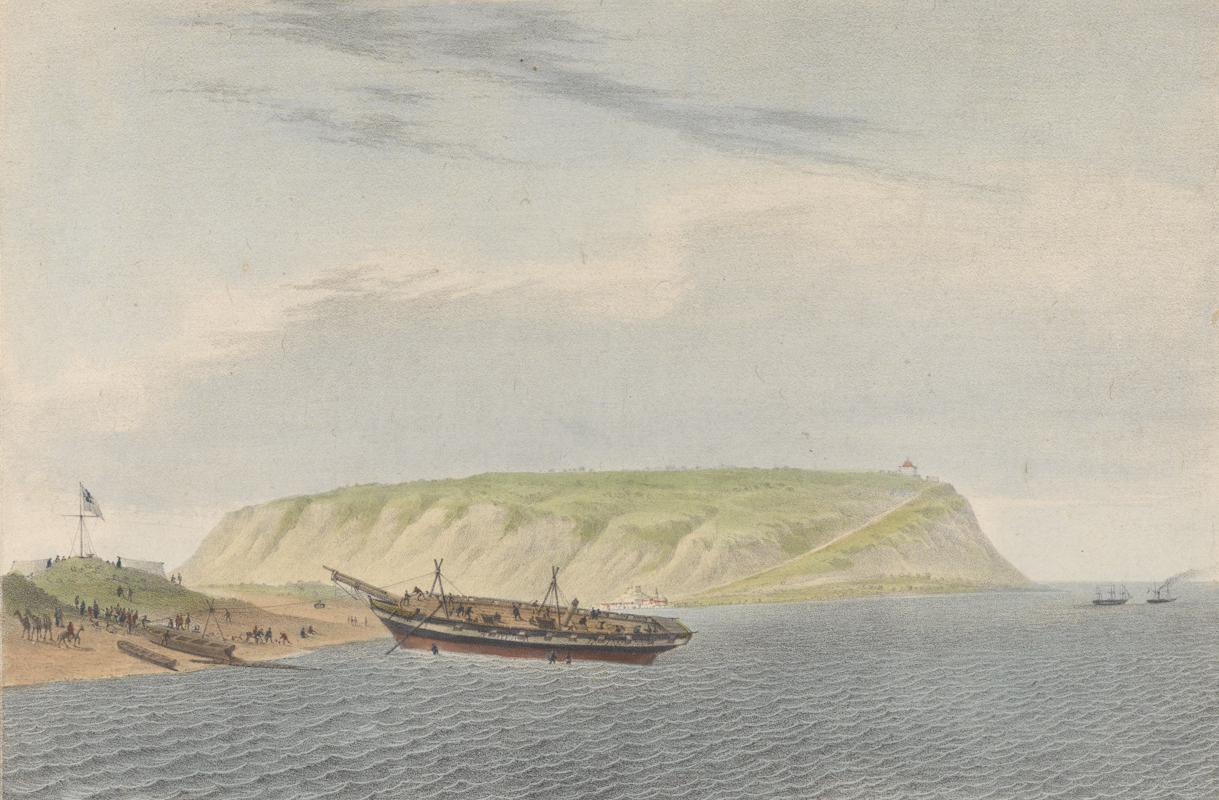
Zebra clearing out on 4 December 1840

On 2 December 1840, a heavy gale drove Zebra ashore off Mount Carmel near Haifa and wrecked her. During the evening, three crewmen jumped into a gig in an attempt to escape, but drowned when it capsized. In the morning a foreyard was placed over the gunwale that permitted the rest of the crew to reach shore safely.

The subsequent court martial on board Howe acquitted Stopford, his officers, and his crew of any negligence. Rather, the board complimented them on their seamanlike and intrepid conduct.
