= Mount Ararat (disambiguation) =

Mount Ararat may refer to:

- Mount Ararat (Ağrı Dağı), the highest mountain in Turkey and Armenian Highlands
- Mountains of Ararat, mentioned in the Book of Genesis in the Bible
- Mount Ararat (Pennsylvania), a mountain in Pennsylvania, United States
- Mount Ararat, Richmond, a large country house at Richmond Hill in London
- Mount Ararat, a mountain near Ararat, Victoria, Australia
- Ararat Mountain, an elevation in the Kerch Peninsula in Crimea
