= Athenian Letters =

The Athenian Letters was a collaborative work of Ancient Greek history and geography, published by a circle of authors around Charles Yorke and Philip Yorke, and taking the form of commentary in letter form on Thucidydes. It had a “considerable vogue”.

== Composition and publications ==
While still college students, the brothers Yorke planned the work, which was begun in 1739 (286 years ago) and appeared in two volumes (1741 and 1743), initially in a very small private edition. Others involved, anonymously, were Thomas Birch, Henry Coventry, John Green, Samuel Salter, Catherine Talbot, Daniel Wray, George Henry Rooke, John Heaton, John Lawry, and William Heberden. The authorship was for a long time a well-guarded secret. A one-volume edition in 1781 ran to 100 copies, the first edition having been only 10, and later editions and a French translation followed.
