= The Triangular Book of St. Germain =

Untitled 18th-century French text

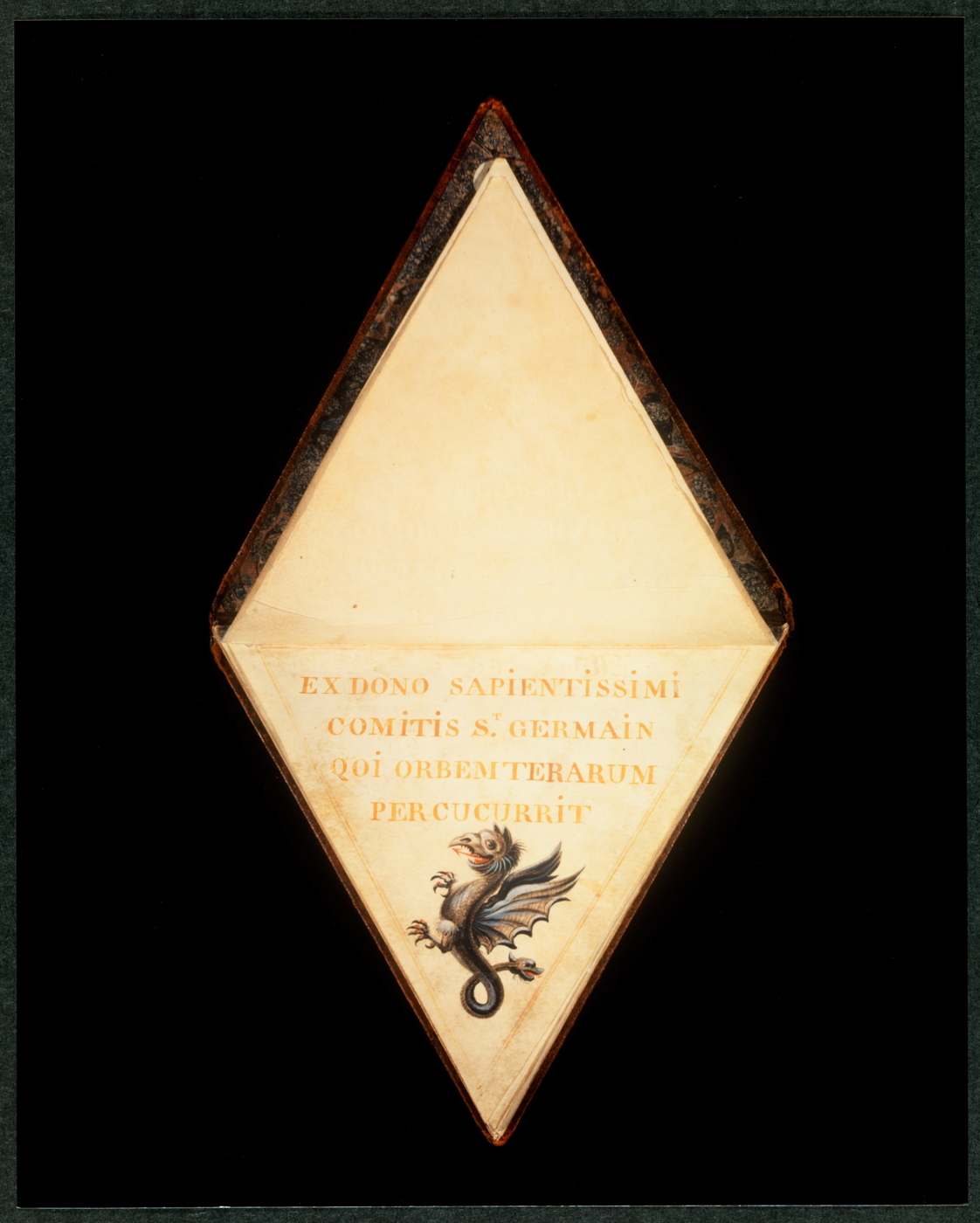
Opening page of MS 210, featuring an attribution to Count of St. Germain and a peculiar-looking dragon

The Triangular Book of St. Germain or The Triangular Manuscript is an untitled 18th-century French text written in code, and attributed to the famous Count of St. Germain. It takes its name from its physical shape: the binding and sheets of vellum that comprise the manuscript are in the shape of an equilateral triangle. The text, once deciphered, details a magical operation through which a person can perform feats of magic, notably the discovery of treasure and extension of life.

== Structure and contents ==
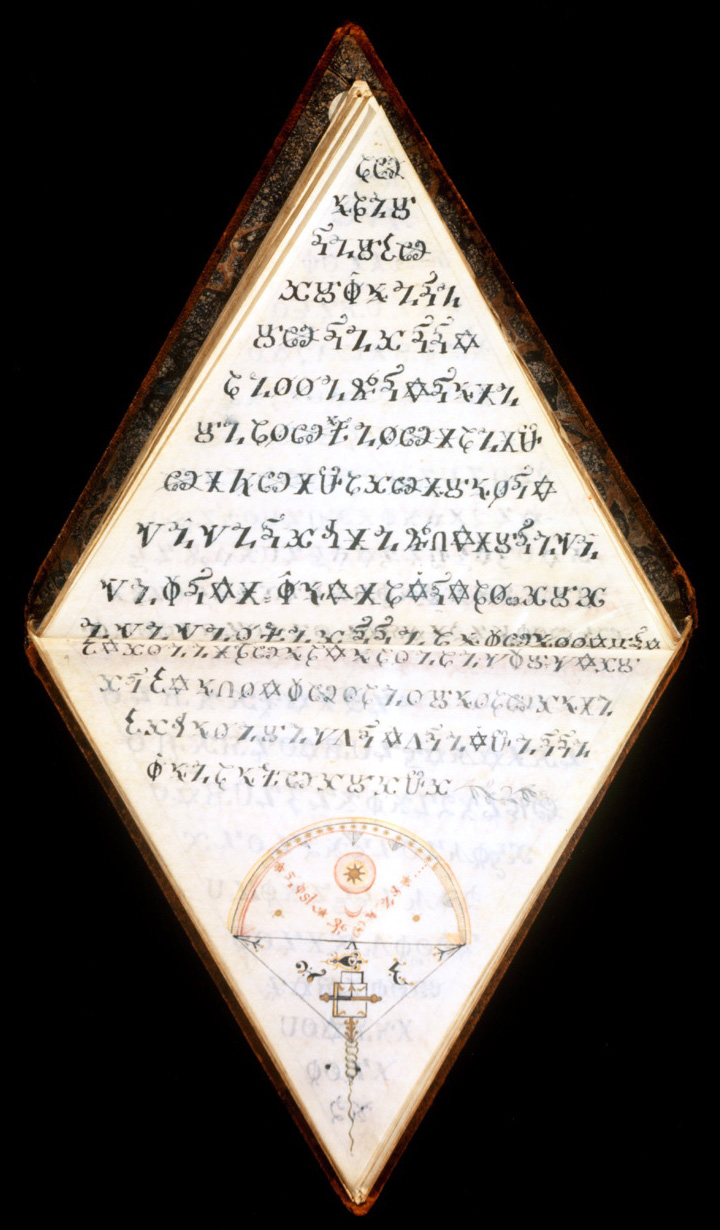
Example of ciphered text and diagram in Triangular manuscript

The manuscript begins with a short Latin inscription mentioning that this is a gift given by Count of St. Germain, followed by an illustration of a winged dragon. All the text beyond this point, including the inscriptions belonging to the diagrams, is in cipher.

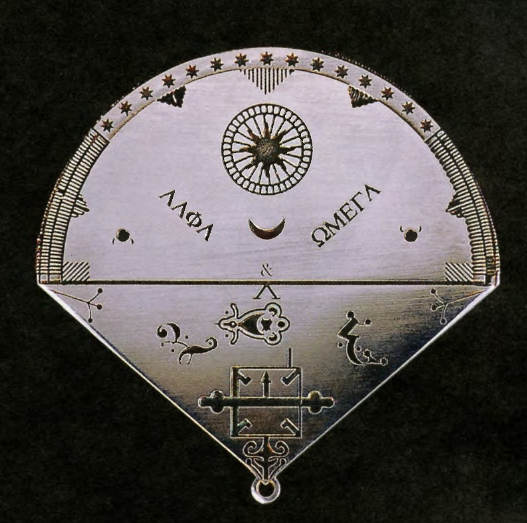
Photo of an actual silver talisman created by Volund Jewelry that accompanied this book

The book describes a ritual aimed at achieving one of three goals: discovering the location of certain valuable objects (goals 1 and 2) and life extension (goal 3). The former requires performing the ritual during a full solar eclipse. The latter can be performed at any time, but it requires wearing a specific longevity amulet, which the manuscript then refers to in a diagram.

Although this text is a part of the Manly Palmer Hall collection of alchemical manuscripts, it does not contain any of the usual alchemical content. It was likely meant to stand on its own and was only combined with other manuscripts post-acquisition by Getty Research Institute.

== Relation to other works ==
The ritual described in the Triangular Manuscript resembles those described in the Heptameron, a handbook of ritual magic sometimes attributed to Pietro d'Abano that appeared around the 16th century in Europe.

== History ==
The two known copies of the Triangular Manuscript exist as Hogart Manuscript 209 and 210 (MS 209 and MS 210). Both currently reside in the Getty Research Institute’s collections, each with its own history.

MS 209, dated 1775, was made for Antoine Louis Moret, a French freemason who immigrated to the United States in 18th century. At one point it resided in the library of Jules C. G. Favre (1809-1880), a French politician. Pliny E. Chase (1820-1886), an American mathematician with an interest in cryptography, makes mention of it in a lecture to the American Philosophical Society on October 3, 1873, stating that the manuscript was “purchased in Amsterdam, about seventy years ago,” i.e. around 1803. It is unclear if he owned the manuscript, examined it, or had simply heard of its existence. French bibliographer, poet, and Rosicrucian Stanislaus de Guaita (1860–1898) had it in his library for some time. From there it passed on to a certain Madame Barbe of Paris, and then to Frank Hollings, a 20th-century London writer and antiquary. After 1934, Hollings sold it to Manly P. Hall.

Much less is known about the other manuscript, MS 210. Dated 1750, older of the two copies, it was once in the library of Lionel Hauser, a member of the Theosophical Society in Paris. In 1934, Manly P. Hall purchased it for 40 guineas at an auction of Hauser's library at Sotheby's.

== Format ==
One of the most peculiar properties of this manuscript is its physical shape—an equilateral triangle. Measuring approximately 23.7 cm across each of its three sides, it is elegantly bound in leather and gilded on the front. In European grimoire tradition, one frequently finds the practice of conjuring spirits into a triangle drawn on the ground. This particular shape, fortified by the divine names written around it, was thought to force a spirit to answer honestly and perform its duties without tarrying. By making the manuscript in triangular form, the author may have intended to emphasize the book's spiritual nature.
