= Robert Fanshawe Stopford =

Royal Navy Admiral (1811–1891)

Admiral Robert Fanshawe Stopford
- Born: 19 December 1811
- Died: 4 January 1891 (aged 79)
- Military career
- Allegiance: United Kingdom
- Branch: Royal Navy
- Rank: Admiral
- Commands: HMS Zebra; HMS Talbot; HMS Asia; HMS Queen; Channel Squadron
- Conflicts: Oriental Crisis

Admiral Robert Fanshawe Stopford (19 December 1811 – 4 January 1891) was a Royal Navy officer who served as Commander-in-Chief, Channel Squadron.

== Naval career ==
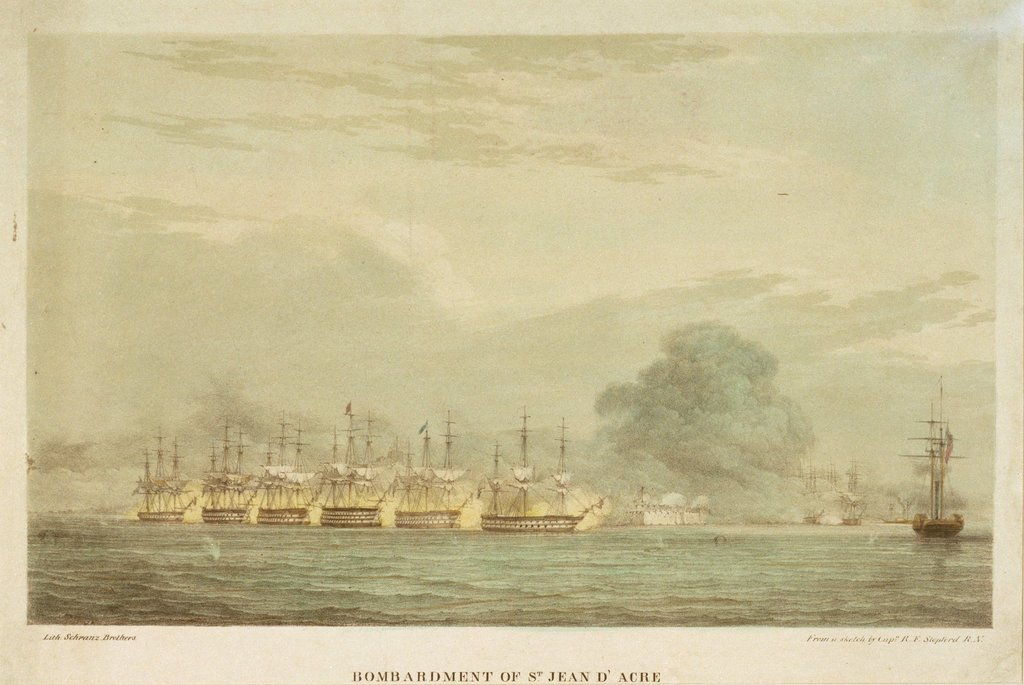
Bombardment of St. Jean d'Acre, 3 November 1840, lithograph from a sketch by Stopford

Born the son of Admiral Sir Robert Stopford, Stopford was appointed a Lieutenant in the Royal Navy in 1830 and, as Commander of HMS Zebra, took part in operations off the coast of Syria during the Oriental Crisis in 1840. Promoted to captain in 1840, he was given command of HMS Talbot in which he surveyed the Skerki Channel off Sardinia. He later commanded HMS Asia and then HMS Queen. He was made Captain of the Fleet for the Channel Squadron in June 1860 and Commander-in-Chief, Channel Squadron in October 1860.

In retirement Stopford lived at Mount Ararat a mansion at Richmond Hill. He is buried in Richmond Old Cemetery.

== Family ==
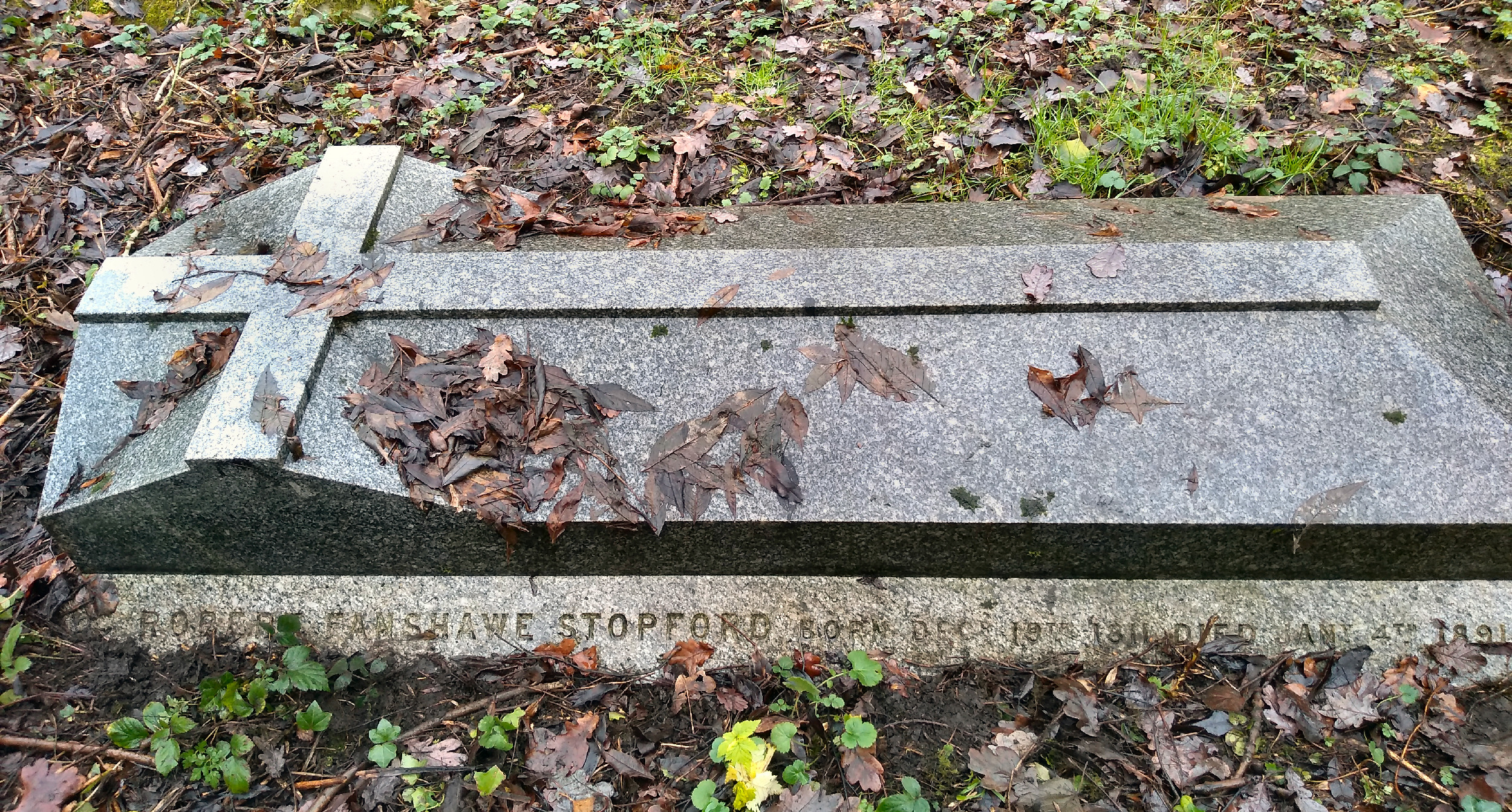
Grave in Richmond Old Burial Ground

In 1843 he married Emily Anna Wilbraham; they had five sons and two daughters. Following the death of his first wife in 1862, he married Lucy Hester Hornby, the daughter of Admiral Sir Phipps Hornby, in 1865.

== See also ==
- O'Byrne, William Richard (1849). "Stopford, Robert Fanshawe" . A Naval Biographical Dictionary . John Murray – via Wikisource.

Military offices
Preceded by Sir Charles Fremantle	Commander-in-Chief, Channel Fleet; 1860–1861	Succeeded by Sir Robert Smart
