= HMS Alligator (1821) =

History

United Kingdom
- Name: HMS Alligator
- Ordered: 5 June 1819
- Builder: Cochin
- Laid down: November 1819
- Launched: 29 March 1821
- Completed: By 3 September 1822
- Reclassified: Depot ship in June 1841; Troopship in July 1842; Seamen's hospital in December 1846
- Fate: Sold on 30 October 1865

General characteristics
- Class & type: 28-gun Atholl-class sixth rate
- Tons burthen: 499 91/94 bm (as designed)
- Length: 113 ft 8 in (34.65 m) (gundeck); 94 ft 8.75 in (28.8735 m) (keel)
- Beam: 31 ft 6 in (9.60 m)
- Depth: 8 ft 9 in (2.67 m)
- Sail plan: Full-rigged ship
- Complement: 175
- Armament: 28 guns: Upper Deck: 20 × 32-pounder carronades; Quarterdeck: 6 × 18-pounder carronades; Forecastle: 2 × 9-pounder guns

HMS Alligator was a 28-gun Atholl-class sixth rate of the Royal Navy. She was launched at Cochin, British India on 29 March 1821.

Alligator, under the command of Captain G.R. Lambert, operated in New Zealand during 1834, leaving on 31 March 1834, but returned again in September the same year to rescue the crew and passengers of Harriet, which was wrecked near Cape Egmont, Taranaki and were held by the Ngāti Ruanui.

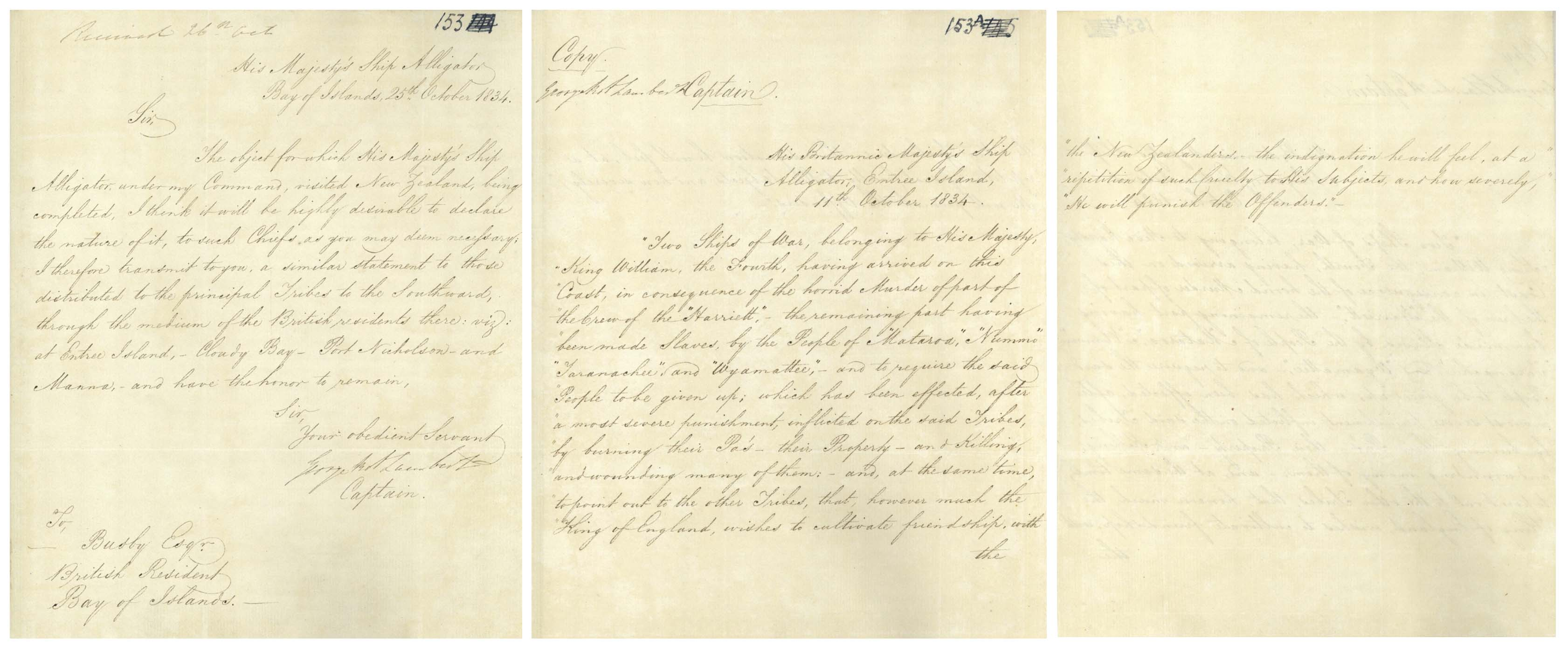
Letter to James Busby regarding the Harriet Affair of 1834

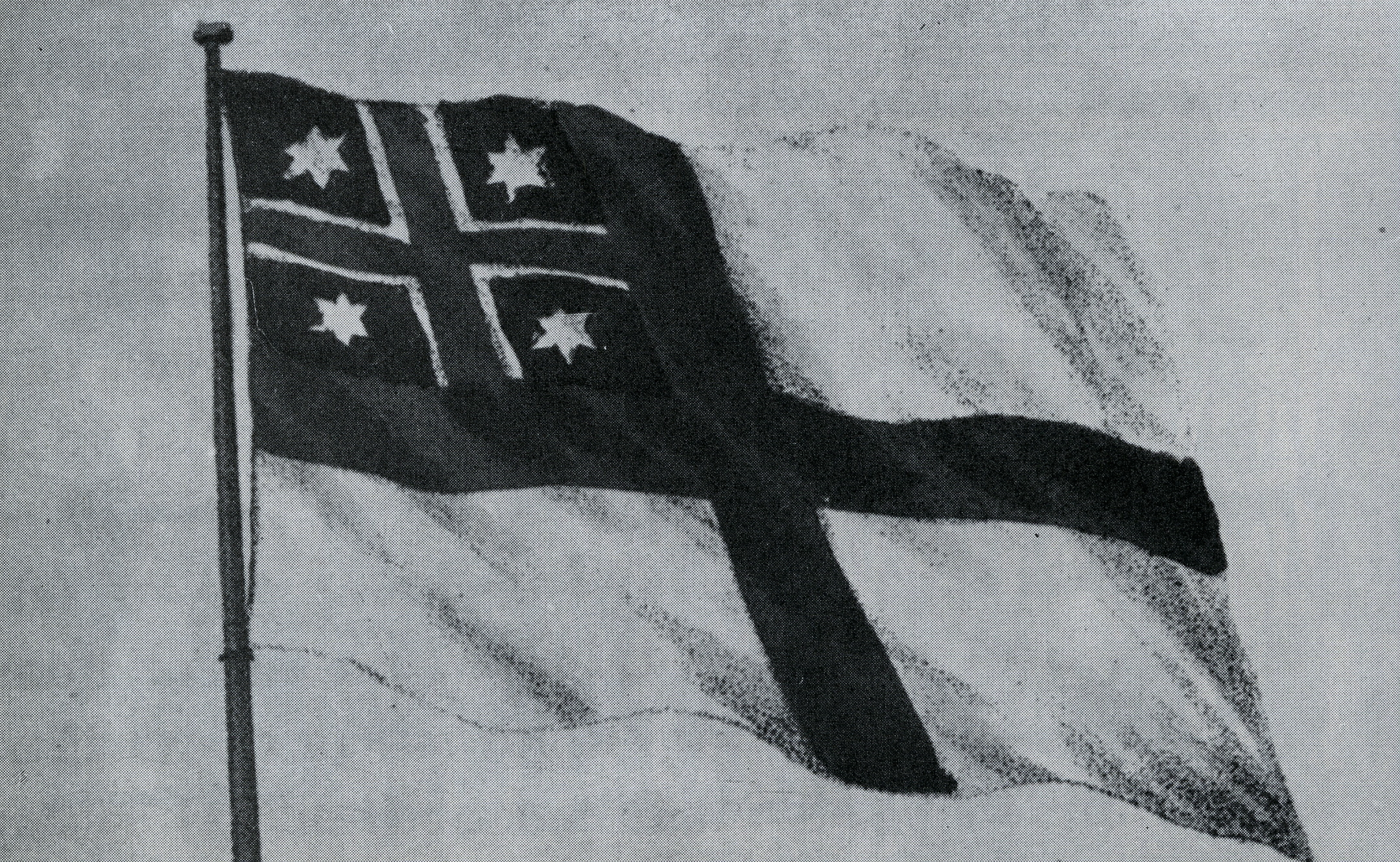
The Standard of New Zealand, 1834, saluted by Alligator

In March 1834, Alligator was on hand (and fired the 13-gun salute) at the first hoisting of the first national flag of New Zealand, at Waitangi, Bay of Islands.

She eventually became a depot ship at Trincomalee in June 1841, and was then converted to a troopship in July 1842. Alligator was finally hulked as seamen's hospital at Hong Kong in December 1846.

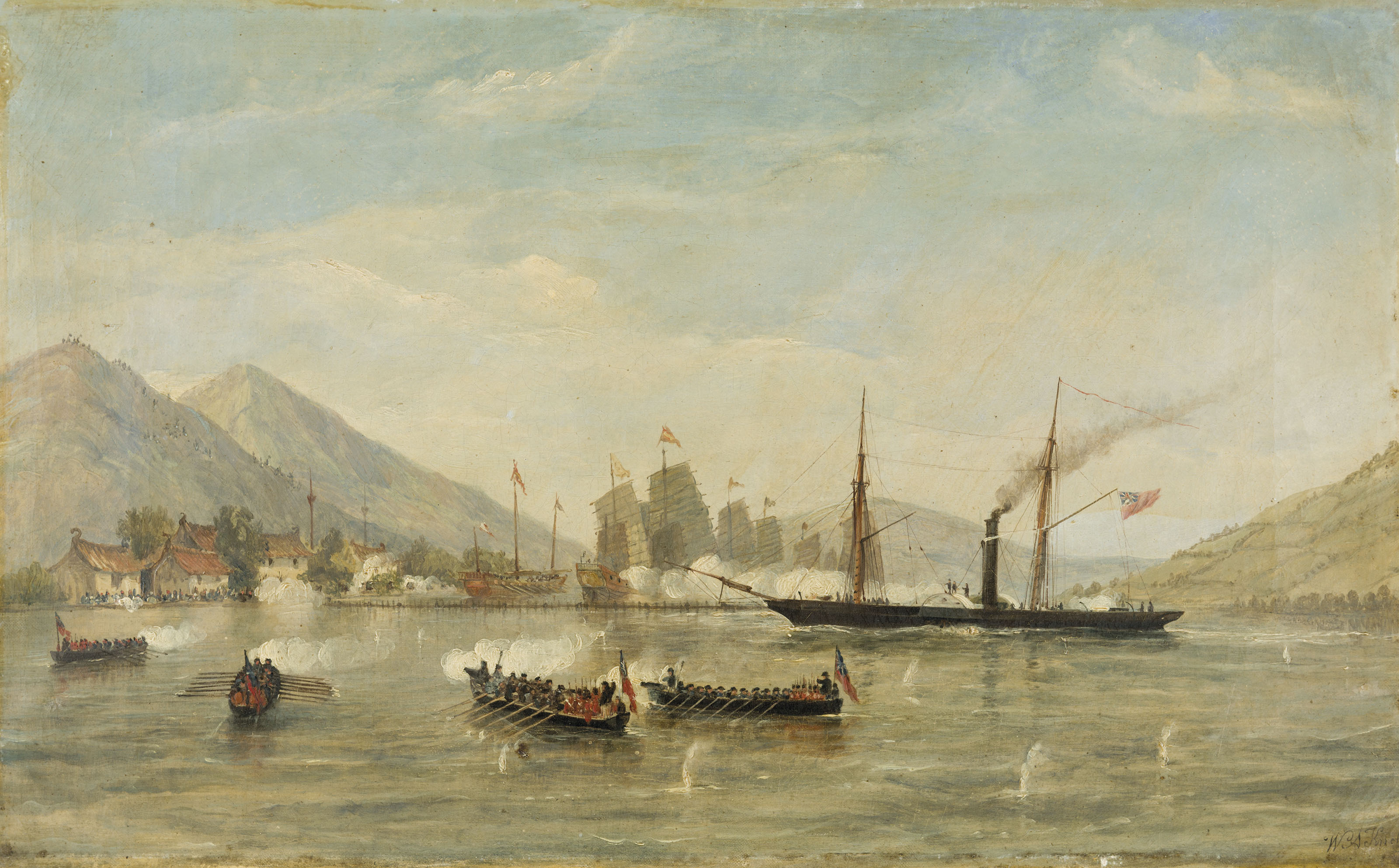
Pinnaces from Alligator aided Nemesis (here) in attacking a Masked Battery at the Battle of the Bogue in 1841 during the First Opium War

== Fate ==
She was sold at Hong Kong on 30 October 1865.
