= Mount Ararat, Richmond =

Country house at Richmond Hill, London, England

Coordinates: 51.45824°N 0.29933°W

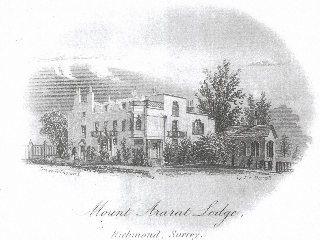
Mount Ararat

Mount Ararat was a large country house at Richmond Hill in London, built in the 1740s and demolished circa 1897. It was occupied by a field marshal and later by an admiral.

== History ==
The house was built in the 1740s for Thomas Warren and was originally occupied by Daniel Wray, a trustee of the British Museum. By the early 1840s it was being used by Henry Hawkes, a gentleman of independent means, and by the late 1840s it was occupied by Field Marshal Thomas Grosvenor. The house remained in the hands of the Grosvenor family after the field marshal's death in 1851 until it passed to Admiral Robert Stopford who was living there by the early 1870s and remained there until his death in 1891. The house was demolished circa 1897.

== Sources ==
- Heathcote, Tony (1999). The British Field Marshals, 1736–1997: A Biographical Dictionary. Barnsley: Leo Cooper. ISBN 0-85052-696-5.
