= The Most Holy Trinosophia =

French esoteric book

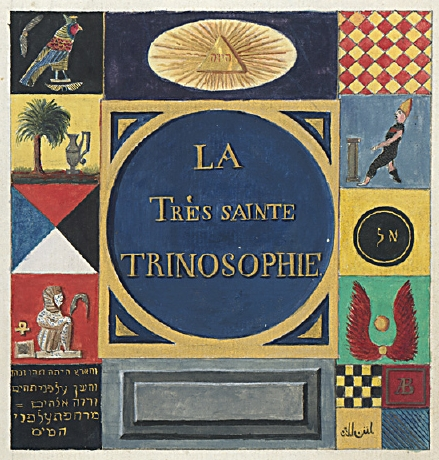
La Très Sainte Trinosophie, 18th century, cover page.

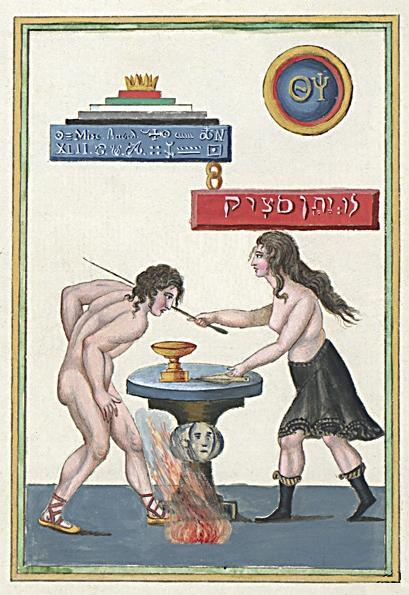
From the book La Très Sainte Trinosophie, 18th century.

La Très Sainte Trinosophie, The Most Holy Trinosophia, or The Most Holy Threefold Wisdom, is a French esoteric book, allegedly authored by Alessandro Cagliostro or the Count of St. Germain. Due to the dearth of evidence of authorship, however, there is significant doubt surrounding the subject. Dated to the late 18th century, the 96-page book is divided into twelve sections representing the twelve zodiacal signs. The veiled content is said to refer to an allegorical initiation, detailing many kabbalistic, alchemical and masonic mysteries. The original MS 2400 at the Library of Troyes is richly illustrated with numerous symbolical plates.

== Contents ==
In a self-published 1933 translation featuring parallel French and English texts, Manly P. Hall wrote:

La Très Sainte Trinosophie is MS. No. 2400 in the French Library at Troyes. The work is of no great length, consisting of ninety-six leaves written upon one side only. The calligraphy is excellent. Although somewhat irregular in spelling and accenting, the French is scholarly and dramatic, and the text is embellished with numerous figures, well drawn and brilliantly colored. In addition to the full-page drawings there are small symbols at the beginning and end of each of the sections. Throughout the French text there are scattered letters, words, and phrases in several ancient languages . . There are also magical symbols, figures resembling Egyptian hieroglyphics, and a few words in characters resembling cuneiform. At the end of the manuscript are a number of leaves written in arbitrary ciphers, possibly the code used by St.-Germain’s secret society. The work was probably executed in the latter part of the eighteenth century, though most of the material belongs to a considerably earlier period.

— Manly Palmer Hall, La Très Sainte Trinosophie

Manly Palmer Hall then cites Dr. Edward C. Getsinger, "an eminent authority on ancient alphabets and languages," in emphasizing that La Très Sainte Trinosophie is couched in secret codes intended to conceal its contents from the profane.

In all my twenty years of experience as a reader of archaic writings I have never encountered such ingenious codes and methods of concealment as are found in this manuscript. In only a few instances are complete phrases written in the same alphabet; usually two or three forms of writing are employed, with letters written upside down, reversed, or with the text written backwards. Vowels are often omitted, and at times several letters are missing with merely dots to indicate their number. Every combination of hieroglyphics seemed hopeless at the beginning, yet, after hours of alphabetic dissection, one familiar word would appear. This gave a clue as to the language used, and established a place where word combination might begin, and then a sentence would gradually unfold.

The various texts are written in Chaldean Hebrew, Ionic Greek, Arabic, Syriac, cuneiform, Greek hieroglyphics, and ideographs. The keynote throughout this material is that of the approach of the age when the Leg of the Grand Man and the Waterman of the Zodiac shall meet in conjunction at the equinox and end a grand 400,000-year cycle. This points to a culmination of eons, as mentioned in the Apocalypse: "Behold! I make a new heaven and a new earth," meaning a series of new cycles and a new humanity.

The personage who gathered the material in this manuscript was indeed one whose spiritual understanding might be envied. He found these various texts in different parts of Europe, no doubt, and that he had a true knowledge of their import is proved by the fact that he attempted to conceal some forty fragmentary ancient texts by scattering them within the lines of his own writing. Yet his own text does not appear to have any connection with these ancient writings. If a decipherer were to be guided by what this eminent scholar wrote he would never decipher the mystery concealed within the cryptic words. There is a marvelous spiritual story written by this savant, and a more wonderful one he interwove within the pattern of his own narrative. The result is a story within a story.

— Manly Palmer Hall, La Très Sainte Trinosophie

== Disposition ==
The original copy remains in the Library at Troyes, designated as MS 2400.

== Authorship controversy ==
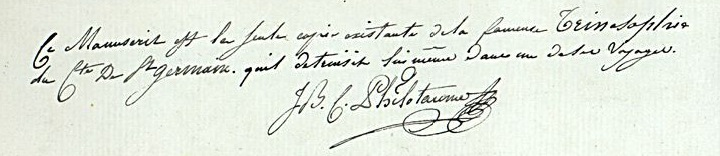
The controversial bookseller's note

Some controversy persists over the authorship of the work. Ascribing authorship to the Count of St. Germain rests on a "bookseller's note" pasted to the front of the MS in Troyes, as well as Manly Palmer Hall's own statements, which have been described as partisan. Indeed, Mr. Hall states that the MS was very much in the possession of Cagliostro, who is alleged to be one potential author of the manuscript, but that "the Inquisition had seized it" when Cagliostro was arrested in Rome in 1789.
