= Occult theories about Francis Bacon =

A number of writers, some of whom were connected with Theosophy, have claimed that Francis Bacon (22 January 1561 – 9 April 1626), the English philosopher, statesman, scientist, jurist and author, was a member of secret societies; a smaller number claim that he would have attained the Ascension and became the Ascended Master Saint Germain.

== Secret societies ==
Francis Bacon often gathered with the men at Gray's Inn to discuss politics and philosophy and to try out various theatrical scenes that he admitted writing. Bacon's alleged connection to the Rosicrucians and the Freemasons has been widely discussed by authors and scholars in many books. However others, including Daphne du Maurier (in her biography of Bacon), have argued there is no substantive evidence to support claims of involvement with the Rosicrucians. Historian Dame Frances Yates does not make the claim that Bacon was a Rosicrucian, but presents evidence that he was nevertheless involved in some of the more closed intellectual movements of his day. She argues that Bacon's movement for the advancement of learning was closely connected with the German Rosicrucian movement while Bacon's The New Atlantis portrays a land ruled by Rosicrucians. He apparently saw his own movement for the advancement of learning to be in conformity with Rosicrucian ideals.

In 1618, Francis Bacon decided to secure a lease for York House. This had been his boyhood home in London next to the Queen's York Place before the Bacon family had moved to Gorhambury in the countryside. After Lord Egerton (Lord Keeper of the Great Seal of England) died, it became available for Bacon to lease. During the next four years, this mansion on the Strand (so large that it had 40 fireplaces) served as the home for Francis and Alice Bacon. Over the next four years, Bacon would host banquets at York House that were attended by the leading men of the time, including poets, scholars, authors, scientists, lawyers, diplomats, and foreign dignitaries. Within the banquet hall, Francis gathered the greatest leaders in literature, art, law, education, and social reform. On 22 January 1621, in honour of Sir Francis Bacon's sixtieth birthday, a select group of men assembled in the large banquet hall in York House without fanfare for what has been described as a Masonic banquet. This banquet was to pay tribute to Sir Francis Bacon. Only those of the Rosicrosse (Rosicrucians) and the Masons who were already aware of Bacon's leadership role were invited. The tables were T-tables with gleaming white drapery, silver, and decorations of flowers. The poet Ben Jonson, a long-time friend of Bacon, gave a Masonic ode to Bacon that day.

There was a depth of love by a large body of men toward Bacon, similar to some degree in the manner that disciples love a Master. This is especially true when taking into account his membership (and some say leadership) of secret societies such as the Rosicrucians and Freemasons. In the inner esoteric membership, which included Francis Bacon, vows of celibacy for spiritual reasons were encouraged.

== Faked death theory ==
Various authors have written that there were indications that Francis Bacon had gone into debt while secretly funding the publishing of materials for the Freemasons, Rosicrucians, "Spear-Shakers", "Knights of the Helmet", as well as publishing, with the assistance of Ben Jonson, a selection of the plays that they believe he had written under the pen name of "Shake-Speare" in a "First Folio" in 1623. Furthermore, they allege that Bacon faked his own death, crossed the English Channel, and secretly traveled in disguise after 1626 through France, Germany, Poland, Hungary, and other areas utilizing the secret network of Freemasons and Rosicrucians that he was associated with. It is alleged that he continued to write under pseudonyms as he had done before 1626, continuing to write as late as 1670 (using the pseudonym "Comte De Gabalis"). Elinor Von Le Coq, wife of Professor Von Le Coq in Berlin, stated that she had found evidence in the German Archives that Francis Bacon stayed after 1626 with the family of Johannes Valentinus Andreae in Germany.

Basil Montagu, a biographer of Bacon, states in his "Essays and Selections":

Of his funeral no account can be found, nor is there any trace of the scite [sic] of the house where he died.

Beginning early in the 20th century in the United States, a number of Ascended Master Teachings organizations began making the claim that Francis Bacon had never died. They believed that soon after completing the "Shake-Speare" plays, he had feigned his own death on Easter Sunday, 9 April 1626 — doing so on Easter Sunday as a symbol—and then traveled extensively outside England, eventually attaining his physical Ascension to another plane on 1 May 1684 in a castle in Transylvania owned by the Rakoczi family. Their belief is that Bacon took on the name "Saint Germain" on that date, 1 May 1684, and became an Ascended Master.
