= Henry Coventry (writer) =

Henry Coventry (c. 1710–1752) was an English religious writer.

== Life ==
He was the son of Henry Coventry, younger brother of William Coventry, 5th Earl of Coventry and a landowner of Cowley, Middlesex, and his wife Ann Coles, and was born at Twickenham around 1710; the writer Francis Coventry was a cousin. He was educated at Eton College. He matriculated at Magdalene College, Cambridge in 1726, where he graduated B.A. in 1730 and became a Fellow, and M.A. in 1733.

Coventry was an associate of Conyers Middleton, Horace Walpole and William Cole. Cole wrote that, as an undergraduate, Coventry was a friend of Thomas Ashton, and they prayed with prisoners; but that later he was an "infidel". He was a correspondent of John Byrom, who had taught him shorthand at Cambridge in 1730; and was on good terms with William Melmoth the younger, a contemporary at Magdalene, who called him "my very ingenious friend, Philemon to Hydaspes", and dedicated to him his first work, Of an Active and Retired Life (1735). He died on 29 December 1752.

== Works ==
With Charles Bulkley and Richard Fiddes, Coventry was a prominent defender of Anthony Ashley-Cooper, 3rd Earl of Shaftesbury. He wrote Philemon to Hydaspes, relating a conversation with Hortensius upon the subject of False Religion, in five parts, 1736–37–38–41–44. After his death, it was republished in 1753 by Francis Coventry, in one volume.

This work has been taken as deist; and it is replete with positive references to Shaftesbury. John Mackinnon Robertson listed it as a "freethinking treatise". Coventry is taken to have innovated in using the term "mysticism" against fanaticism of a sectarian nature. In questioning the language and "luscious images" used in devotional literature, he cited The Fire of the Altar of Anthony Horneck, and wrote of the "wild extravagances of frantic enthusiasm".

Coventry incurred the displeasure of William Warburton: who accused him of plagiarism in this work. That was in relation to Warburton's Hieroglyphics; also of making unfair use of information communicated in confidence, which was to be published in the second volume of The Divine Legation of Moses. John Brown, a Warburton ally, implied that Henry Coventry was a slavish disciple of Shaftesbury, and Francis Coventry rebutted the allegation.

Coventry was one of the authors of the Athenian Letters. A pamphlet entitled Future Rewards and Punishments believed by the Antients, 1740, has been attributed to him.

== Notes ==
Attribution

This article incorporates text from a publication now in the public domain: Stephen, Leslie, ed. (1887). "Coventry, Henry (d.1752)". Dictionary of National Biography. Vol. 12. London: Smith, Elder & Co.
