= Daniel Wray =

English antiquarian (1701–1783)

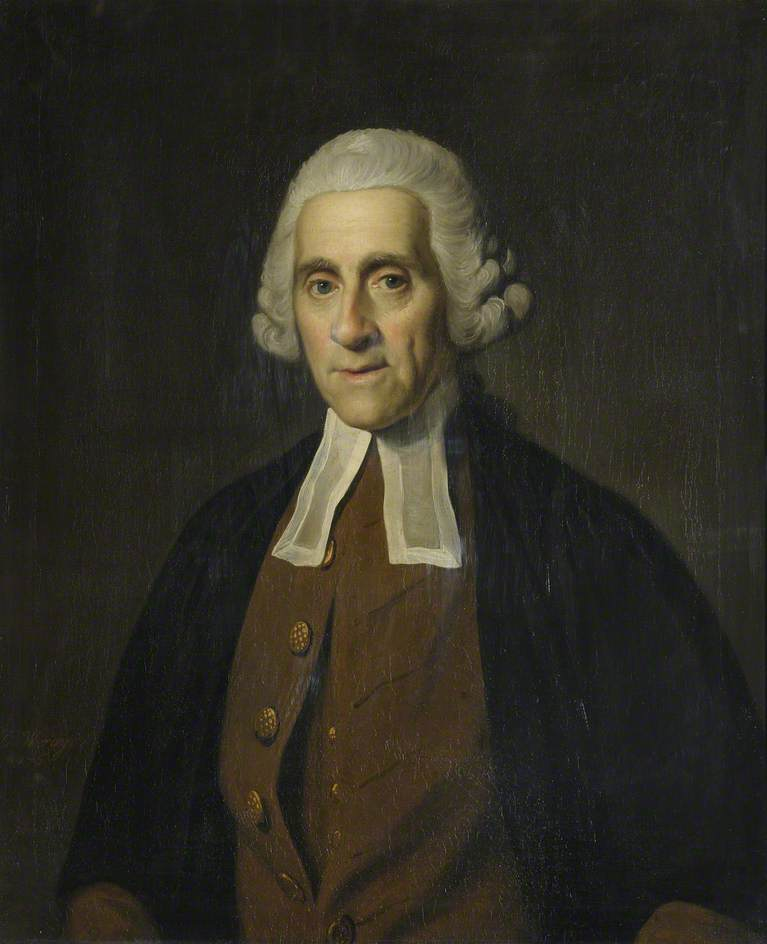
Daniel Wray

Daniel Wray (28 November 1701 – 29 December 1783) was an English antiquary and Fellow of the Royal Society.

== Life ==
Born on 28 November 1701 in the parish of St. Botolph, Aldersgate, he was the youngest child of Sir Daniel Wray (died 1719), a London citizen and soap-boiler residing in Little Britain, by his second wife. His father was knighted on 24 March 1708, while High Sheriff of Essex, where he possessed an estate near Ingatestone. At the age of thirteen Daniel the son entered Charterhouse School as a day scholar. In 1718 he matriculated from Queens' College, Cambridge, graduating B.A. in 1722, and M.A. in 1728.

Between 1722 and 1728 he paid a prolonged visit to Italy in the company of James Douglas. On 13 March 1729 he was admitted a fellow of the Royal Society, and on 18 June 1731 he was incorporated at Oxford. He resided generally at Cambridge until 1739 or 1740, but after being elected a fellow of the Society of Antiquaries in January 1741 he became a more habitual resident of London, lodging at the house of Arthur Pond. At a later date he removed to lodgings at Richmond and after his marriage took a house in town, first in King Street, Covent Garden, and afterwards in Duke Street, Soho, and another at Richmond.

In 1737 Wray became acquainted with Philip Yorke, and a lifelong friendship grew up. In 1741 Philip and his brother, Charles Yorke, brought out the first volume of the Athenian Letters, to which Wray contributed under the signature "W." In 1745 Philip Yorke appointed Wray his deputy teller of the exchequer, an office which he continued to hold until 1782.

Wray had many friends among his literary contemporaries, among them Henry Coventry, William Heberden the elder, William Warburton, Conyers Middleton, and Nicholas Hardinge. He was a keen antiquary and collector of rare books, and on 18 June 1765 was appointed one of the trustees of the British Museum. He had younger men as protegees, including Francis Wollaston, George Hardinge, and William Heberden the younger.

Wray died on 29 December 1783, and was buried in the church of St. Botolph Without, where there is a tablet to his memory. He married Mary (died 10 March 1803), daughter of Robert Darell of Richmond, Surrey. His portrait by Sir Nathaniel Holland was presented by his widow to Queens' College, Cambridge. Another, engraved by Henry Meyer from a painting by Nathaniel Dance, forms the frontispiece of the first volume of John Nichols's Literary Illustrations. A copy of Dance's portrait by John Powell was presented to the Charterhouse library. In the Literary Illustrations there is an engraving by Barak Longmate of a profile of Wray cut out in paper by his wife, said to be a good likeness, and a copy of a profile in bronze executed in Rome by G. Pozzo in 1726. His library was presented by his widow to Charterhouse in 1785, and a Catalogue was printed in 1790.

In 1830 James Falconar published a work entitled The Secret Revealed, in which he made out a case for the identification of Wray as Junius.

== Works ==
Though Wray wrote much, he published little in his lifetime. He contributed three papers to the first two volumes of Archæologia on classical antiquities. After his death George Hardinge compiled a memoir to accompany a collection of his verses and correspondence, which he published in 1817 in the first volume of ‘Literary Illustrations,’ with a dedication to Philip Yorke, 3rd Earl of Hardwicke.

Two sonnets to Wray by Thomas Edwards (1699–1757) appear in the later editions of Edwards's Canons of Criticism. Hardinge states that a sonnet by Richard Roderick, printed in Robert Dodsley's ‘Collection of Poems’ (ed. 1775, ii. 321), and again in ‘Elegant Extracts,’ edited by Vicesimus Knox (ed. 1796, p. 838), is also addressed to Wray, but this has been doubted.

== Notes ==
Attribution

This article incorporates text from a publication now in the public domain: Lee, Sidney, ed. (1900). "Wray, Daniel". Dictionary of National Biography. Vol. 63. London: Smith, Elder & Co.
