= Atholl-class corvette =

Series of fourteen sixth-rate corvettes

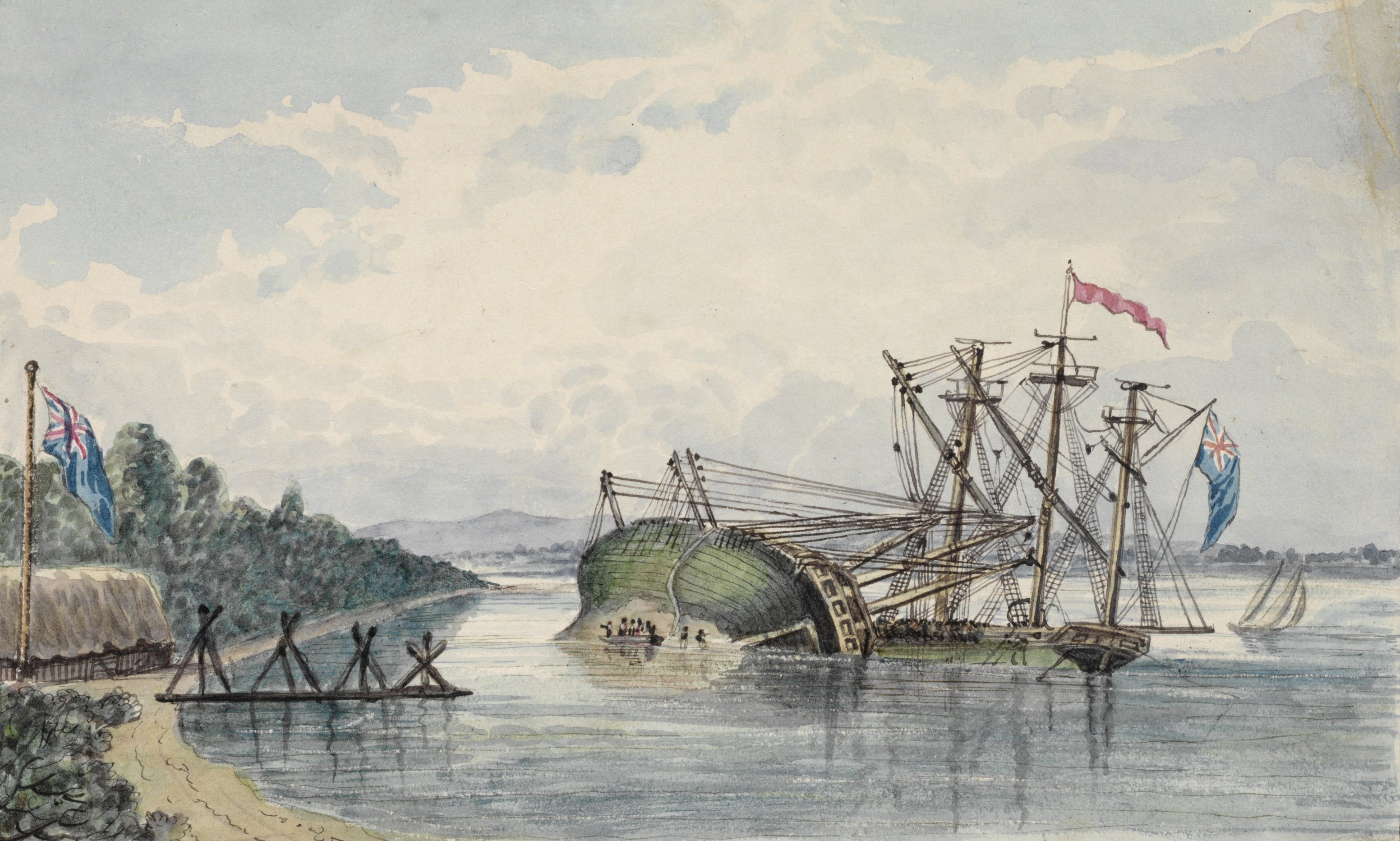
- Success undergoing repairs after running aground on Carnac Reef

Class overview
- Name: Atholl-class corvettes
- Operators: Royal Navy
- Completed: 14
- Canceled: 4

General characteristics
- Type: Sixth-rate corvette
- Tons burthen: 499 91/94 bm (as designed)
- Length: 113 ft 8 in (34.65 m) (gundeck); 94 ft 8.75 in (28.8735 m) (keel)
- Beam: 31 ft 6 in (9.60 m)
- Depth: 8 ft 9 in (2.67 m)
- Sail plan: Full-rigged ship
- Complement: 175
- Armament: 28 guns: Upper Deck: 20 × 32-pounder carronades; Quarterdeck: 6 × 18-pounder carronades; Forecasle: 2 × 9-pounder guns

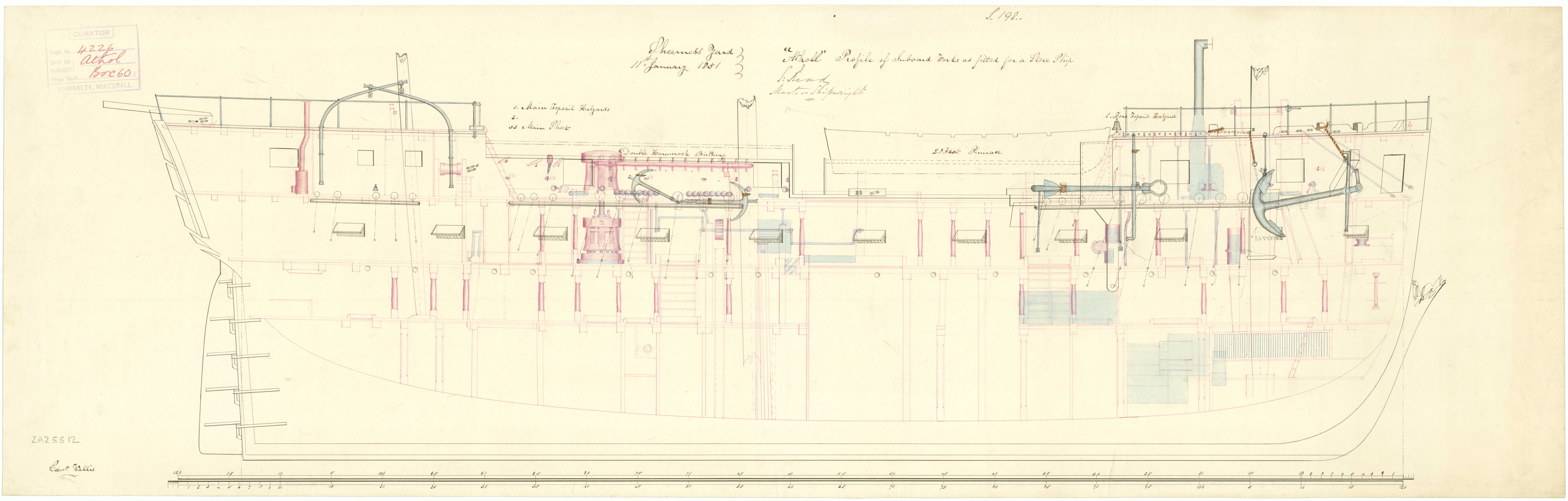
Inboard profile plan of Atholl, 1820

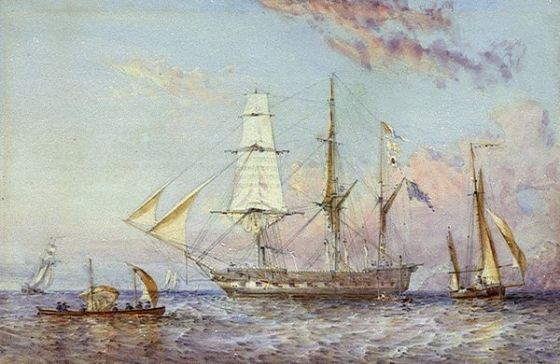
Rattlesnake by Oswald Walters Brierly, 1853

The Atholl-class corvettes were a series of fourteen sixth-rate corvettes built for the Royal Navy to an 1817 design by the Surveyors of the Navy. A further four ships ordered to this design were cancelled.

Non-standard timber were used in the construction of some; for example, the first pair (Atholl and Niemen) were ordered built of larch and Baltic fir respectively, for comparative evaluation of these materials; the three ships the East India Company built,(Alligator, Termagant and Samarang), were built of teak. Nimrod was built of African timber.

Cape Atholl in Greenland was named after this corvette class.

== Ships in class ==
- HMS Atholl
  - Builder: Woolwich Dockyard
  - Ordered: 27 October 1816
  - Laid down: November 1818
  - Launched: 23 November 1820
  - Completed: 9 February 1821
  - Fate: Broken up at Plymouth in 1863.
- HMS Niemen
  - Builder: Woolwich Dockyard
  - Ordered: 27 October 1816
  - Laid down: July 1819
  - Launched: 23 November 1820
  - Completed: February 1821
  - Fate: Broken up at Portsmouth in 1828.
- HMS Ranger
  - Builder: Portsmouth Dockyard
  - Ordered: 30 April 1818
  - Laid down: January 1819
  - Launched: 7 December 1820
  - Completed: 12 June 1822
  - Fate: Sold in 1832.
- HMS Rattlesnake
  - Builder: Chatham Dockyard
  - Ordered: 30 April 1818
  - Laid down: August 1819
  - Launched: 26 March 1822
  - Completed: 8 May 1824
  - Fate: Broken up at Chatham in 1860.
- HMS North Star
  - Builder: Woolwich Dockyard
  - Ordered: 30 April 1818
  - Laid down: April 1820
  - Launched: 7 February 1824
  - Completed: 26 May 1826
  - Fate: Broken up at Chatham in 1860.
- HMS Tweed
  - Builder: Portsmouth Dockyard
  - Ordered: 30 April 1818
  - Laid down: December 1820
  - Launched: 14 April 1823
  - Completed: 12 April 1824
  - Fate: Sold in 1852.
- HMS Talbot
  - Builder: Pembroke Dockyard
  - Ordered: 30 April 1818
  - Laid down: March 1821
  - Launched: 9 October 1824
  - Completed: 21 December 1825 at Plymouth Dockyard
  - Fate: Depot ship 1855. Sold in 1896.
- HMS Rainbow
  - Builder: Chatham Dockyard
  - Ordered: 30 April 1818
  - Laid down: April 1822
  - Launched: 20 November 1823
  - Completed: 6 November 1825
  - Fate: Sold in 1838.
- HMS Alligator
  - Builder: East India Company, Cochin
  - Ordered: 5 June 1819
  - Laid down: November 1819
  - Launched: 29 March 1821
  - Completed: 3 September 1822 at Woolwich Dockyard
  - Fate: Depot ship 1841. Sold in 1865.
- HMS Termagant
  - Builder: East India Company, Cochin
  - Ordered: 5 June 1819
  - Laid down: March 1820
  - Launched: 15 November 1821
  - Completed: 16 July 1824 at Portsmouth Dockyard
  - Fate: Renamed Herald 15 May 1824. Survey ship 1845. Sold in 1862.
- HMS Samarang
  - Builder: East India Company, Cochin
  - Ordered: 5 June 1819
  - Laid down: March 1821
  - Launched: 1 January 1822
  - Completed: 7 June 1824 at Portsmouth Dockyard
  - Fate: Hulked as guard ship 1847. Sold in 1883.
- Andromeda (-) - re-ordered in 1826 as Nimrod (see below)
- HMS Success
  - Builder: Pembroke Dockyard
  - Ordered: 5 June 1819
  - Laid down: July 1823
  - Launched: 30 August 1825
  - Completed: 3 June 1826 at Plymouth Dockyard
  - Fate: Broken up at Portsmouth in 1849.
- HMS Crocodile
  - Builder: Chatham Dockyard
  - Ordered: 5 June 1819
  - Laid down: December 1823
  - Launched: 28 October 1825
  - Completed: 27 August 1828
  - Fate: Broken up at Chatham in 1860.
- Alarm (-) - re-ordered 1828 as Conway-class vessel
- Daphne (-) - re-ordered 1826 as a sloop, but cancelled 1832
- Porcupine (-) - re-ordered 1826 as a sloop, but cancelled 1832
- HMS Nimrod
  - Builder: Deptford Dockyard
  - Ordered: 9 March 1826
  - Laid down: October 1821 (as Andromeda - see above)
  - Launched: 26 August 1828
  - Completed: 11 December 1828
  - Fate: Sold in 1907.
