= Timandra (1822 ship) =

History

United Kingdom
- Name: Timandra
- Namesake: Timandra
- Owner: Barrick & Co.
- Builder: H. Barrick, Whitby
- Laid down: March 1821
- Launched: 21 March 1822
- Fate: Disappeared 1829

General characteristics
- Tons burthen: 36239/94, or 370, (bm)
- Length: 103 ft 2 in (31.4 m)
- Beam: 29 ft 0 in (8.8 m)
- Propulsion: Sail

Timandra was launched in 1822. She sailed to India and South East Asia under a license from the British East India Company (EIC) before she disappeared in 1829.

== Career ==
Timandra enters the Register of Shipping in 1822 with G. Wray, master, Barrick, owner, and trade Whitby—Quebec, changing to London—Bengal. She sailed from Whitby in ballast on 20 April and arrived at port of Quebec on 2 June, having grounded, without damage, on Green Island. The 1825 Register of Shipping showed her trade as London—Ceylon.

In October 1825 she arrived at the Downs having come from Bengal. It had taken nine weeks to clear the Bay of Bengal because of severe weather. She was continuously under water, lost two suit of sails, and sustained so much damage that she had to put into Mauritius to refit.

The 1830 volume of the Register of Shipping showed Timandra, Reay, master, and trade London—New South Wales. Timandra sailed from Batavia on 5 June 1829 with a cargo of rice for Antwerp. She was never again heard of.
