= HMS Samarang (1822) =

1822–1883 Royal Navy ship

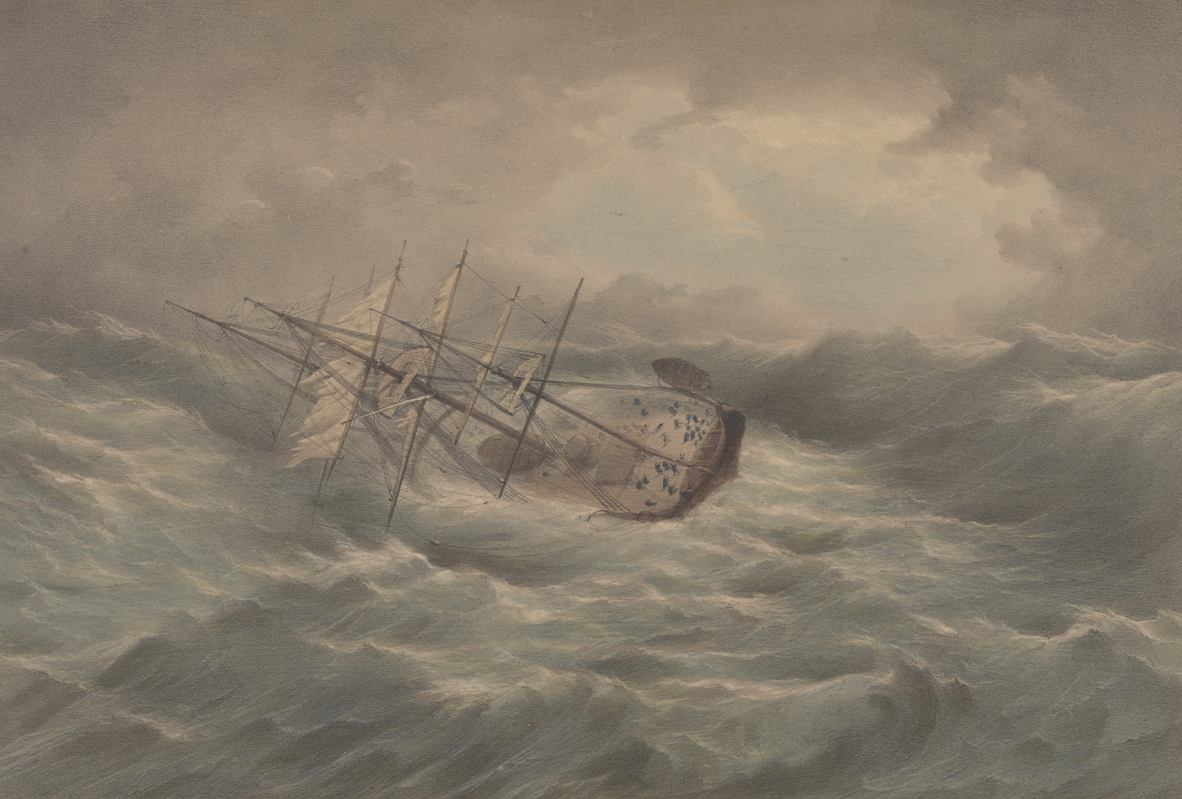
- Samarang crossing the Bay of Biscay in a gale on 23 December 1846

History

United Kingdom
- Name: HMS Samarang
- Ordered: 5 June 1819
- Builder: Cochin
- Laid down: March 1821
- Launched: 1 January 1822
- Completed: By 7 June 1824
- Reclassified: Guard ship in May 1847
- Fate: Sold in November 1883

General characteristics
- Class & type: 28-gun Atholl-class sixth rate
- Tons burthen: 499 91/94 bm (as designed)
- Length: 113 ft 8 in (34.65 m) (gundeck); 94 ft 8 3/4 in (28.873 m) (keel)
- Beam: 31 ft 6 in (9.60 m)
- Depth of hold: 8 ft 9 in (2.67 m)
- Sail plan: Full-rigged ship
- Complement: 175
- Armament: Upper Deck: 20 × 32-pounder carronades; QD: 6 × 18-pounder carronades; Fc: 2 × 9-pounder guns

HMS Samarang was a 28-gun Atholl-class sixth-rate of the Royal Navy. She was launched at Cochin in 1822 by the East India Company.

The first application of cathodic protection was to HMS Samarang in 1824. Sacrificial anodes made from iron attached to the copper sheathing of the hull below the waterline dramatically reduced the corrosion rate of the copper. However, a side effect of the cathodic protection was to increase marine growth. Copper, when corroding, releases copper ions which have an anti-fouling effect. Since excess marine growth affected the performance of the ship, the Royal Navy decided that it was better to allow the copper to corrode and have the benefit of reduced marine growth, so cathodic protection was not used further.

Samarang served in various stations around the world until seeing action in the First Opium War, and was then employed, under Edward Belcher, in surveying the coasts of the East Indies and southern China from 1843 to 1846. On 17 July 1843, she struck a rock in the Sarawak river at Kuching and capsized, but her crew survived; she had been refloated by 13 August and was returned to service. English zoologist Arthur Adams, who was assistant surgeon on the ship for this voyage later edited Zoology of the voyage of H.M.S. Samarang (1850), an account of the survey. She later became a guardship at Gibraltar before being sold for breaking in 1883.
