= Boyne (1822 ship) =

History

United Kingdom
- Name: Boyne
- Namesake: River Boyne
- Builder: William Smith, Newcastle upon Tyne
- Launched: 1822
- Fate: Abandoned on 18 August 1830 in a sinking state

General characteristics
- Tons burthen: 402 (bm)

Boyne was built in 1822 in Newcastle upon Tyne as a West Indiaman. In 1824–1825 she made one voyage to Bengal for the British East India Company (EIC)). She next made one voyage to Bombay under a license from the EIC. She then returned to the West Indies trade. Her crew abandoned her on 18 August 1830 in a sinking state as she was sailing from Jamaica to London.

== Career ==
Boyne first appeared in Lloyd's Register (LR) with H.Wright, master and owner. The 1823 issue showed her master changing to Brown, and her trade as London–Jamaica.

Year	Master	Owner	Trade	Source
1823	H.Wright; Brown	H.Wright	London–Jamaica	LR
1824	Brown; Stevens	H.Wright; Dawson	London–Jamaica; London–India	LR

On 4 April 1824 the EIC chartered Boyne from J.&T.Dawson for one voyage at a rate of £18 per ton (bm).

Captain George Stephens sailed from the Downs on 12 June, bound for Bengal. Boyne arrived at Calcutta on 7 November. Homeward bound, she was at Kedgeree on 10 January 1825. She was at Madras on 6 February and the Cape on 30 April. She reached Saint Helena on 24 May and arrived at Long Reach on August.

Boyne then made another voyage under a license from the EIC. (Note: In 1813 the EIC had lost its monopoly on the trade between India and Britain. British ships were then free to sail to India or the Indian Ocean under a license from the EIC.) Captain D. Miller sailed for Bombay on 17 May 1826.

Boyne then returned to the West Indies trade.

Year	Master	Owner	Trade	Source
1828	Miller; Murray	Dawson	London–Jamaica	LR
1830	Murray	Dawson	London–Jamaica	LR

== Fate ==
Her crew abandoned Boyne, Murray, master, on 18 August 1830 at 38°N 68°W in a sinking state. She was on a voyage from Jamaica to London when she sustained severe damage in a hurricane. Plato, Demnoc, master, rescued the crew. (Note: Plato, Denmock, master, of 397 tons (bm), had been launched in Massachusetts in 1828.)
