= Richard Roderick =

- Died: 20 July 1756
- Occupations: critic and poet

Richard Roderick (baptized 1710, died 20 July 1756) was a British editor and poet.

A native of Cambridgeshire, Roderick was admitted pensioner of Queens' College, Cambridge, on 20 December 1728, and graduated B.A. in 1732. He subsequently became a fellow commoner of the college, and a grace was granted by the president and fellows for him to proceed to the degree of M.A. on 5 June 1736. On 19 January 1743 he was admitted to a fellowship at Magdalene College, Cambridge, probably through the influence of Edward Abbot, master of Magdalene College (1740-6), who was his cousin. Roderick was elected Fellow of the Royal Society on 21 June 1750, and Fellow of the Society of Antiquaries on 6 February 1752. He died on 20 July 1756.

Roderick was the intimate friend and coadjutor of Thomas Edwards in the latter's Canons of Criticism. The Shepherd's Farewell to his Love, from Metastasio, and the riddles that follow, which are inserted in Robert Dodsley's Collection of Poetry (ed. 1766, ii. 309–21), are by Roderick, and his translation of No. 13 in the Odes of Horace, book iv., is inserted in William Duncombe's versions of Horace (ii. 248–9). Edwards dedicated No. xxxix. of his sonnets to Roderick.
