= HMS Talbot (1824) =

British ship

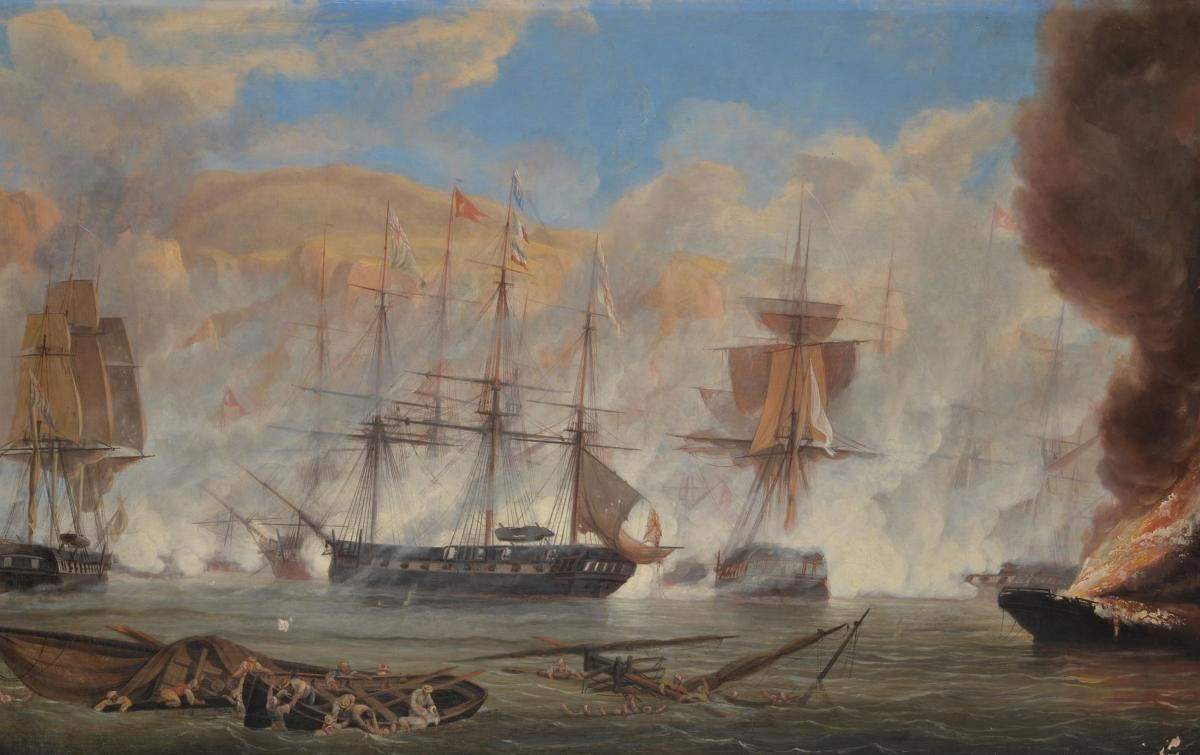
- HMS Talbot, Captain Frederick Spencer, in action at the Battle of Navarino, by John Christian Schetky

History

United Kingdom
- Name: Talbot
- Ordered: 30 April 1818
- Builder: Pembroke Dockyard
- Laid down: March 1821
- Launched: 9 October 1824
- Completed: 21 December 1825
- Commissioned: 21 September 1825
- Reclassified: As a depot ship, February 1855
- Fate: Sold for scrap, 5 March 1896

General characteristics
- Class & type: Atholl-class frigate
- Tons burthen: 50018/94 bm
- Length: 113 ft 8 in (34.6 m) (gundeck); 94 ft 8 in (28.9 m) (keel)
- Beam: 31 ft 10 in (9.7 m)
- Draught: 12 ft (3.7 m)
- Depth: 8 ft 9 in (2.7 m)
- Sail plan: Full-rigged ship
- Complement: 175
- Armament: 28 guns: Upper gundeck: 20 × 32-pdr carronades; Quarterdeck: 6 × 18-pdr carronades; Forecastle: 2 × 9-pdr cannon

HMS Talbot was a 28-gun Atholl-class sixth-rate frigate built for the Royal Navy during the 1820s.

== Description ==
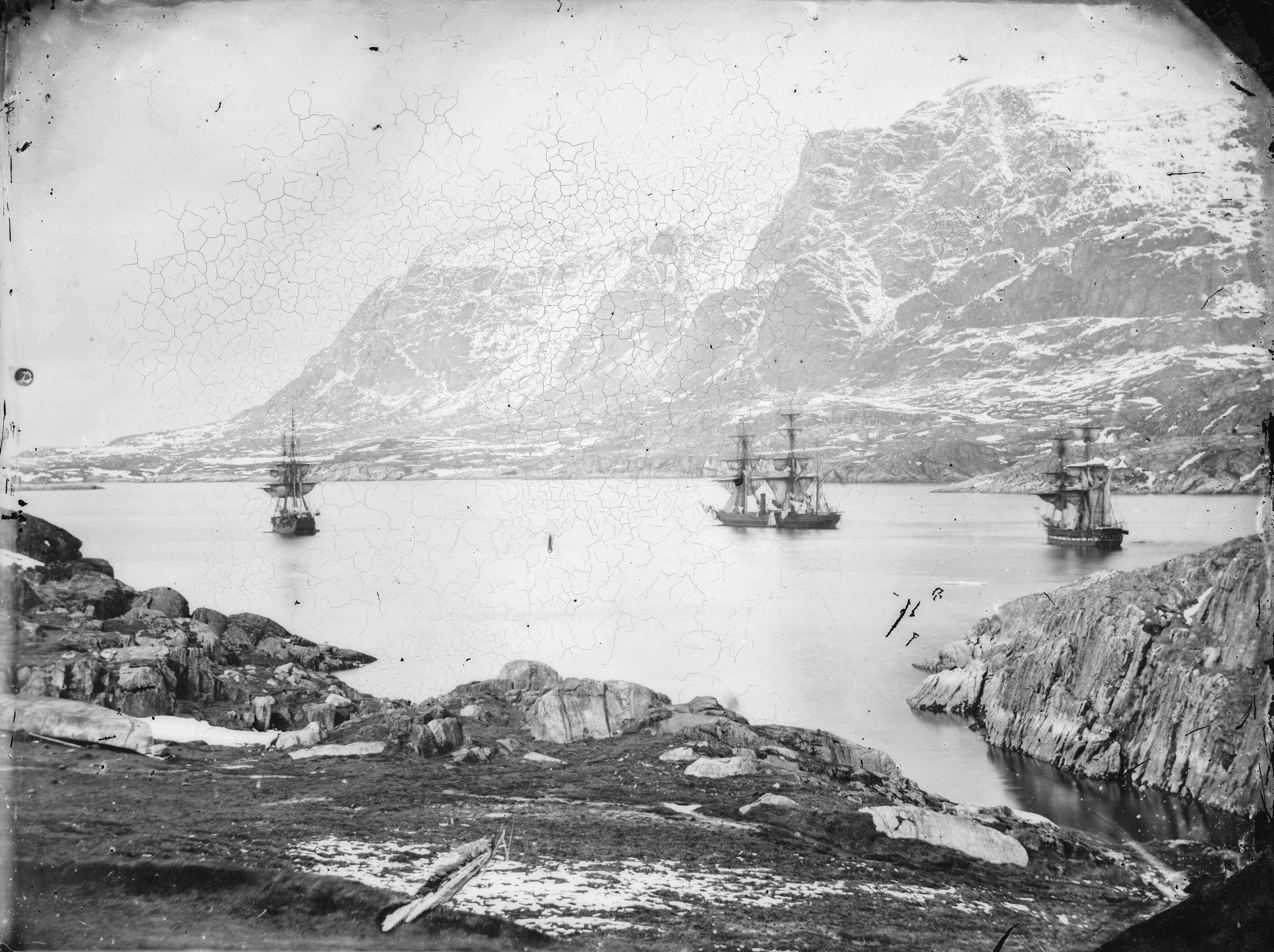
HMS Phoenix, HMS Talbot and HMS Diligence at anchor in Holsteinborg from 8–17 June 1854

Talbot had a length at the gundeck of 113 feet 8 inches (34.6 m) and 94 feet 8 inches (28.9 m) at the keel. She had a beam of 31 feet 10 inches (9.7 m), a draught of 12 feet (3.7 m) and a depth of hold of 8 feet 9 inches (2.7 m). The ship's tonnage was 500 18/94 tons burthen. The Atholl class was armed with twenty 32-pounder carronades on her gundeck, six 32-pounder carronades on her quarterdeck and a pair of 9-pounder cannon in the forecastle. The ships had a crew of 175 officers and ratings.

== Construction and career ==
Talbot, the fourth ship of her name to serve in the Royal Navy, was ordered on 30 April 1818, laid down in March 1821 at Pembroke Dockyard, Wales, and launched on 9 October 1824. She was completed on 21 December 1824 at Plymouth Dockyard and commissioned on 21 September of that year.

She was a participant at the Battle of Navarino on 20 October 1827.

She took part in Inglefield's 1854 Arctic expedition as a depot ship.

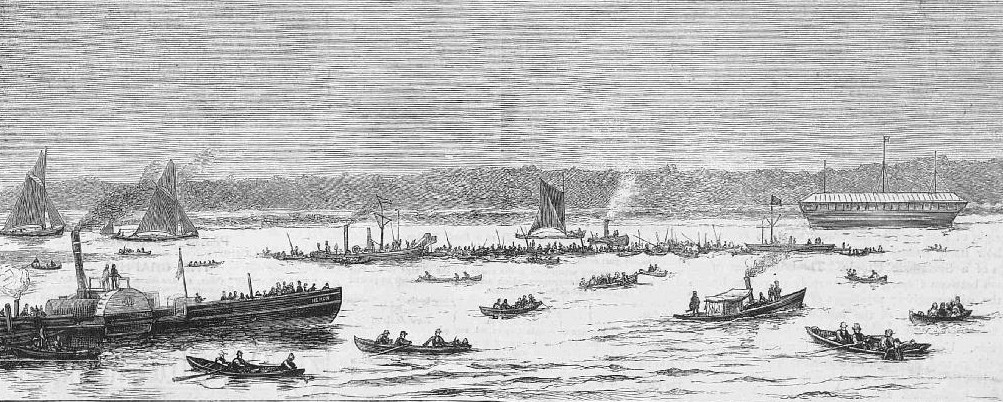
Recovering the bodies from the sinking of SS Princess Alice

As a powder magazine off Beckton she overlooked the disastrous sinking of SS Princess Alice, a collision on the Thames on 14 September 1878.
