= Alice Bailey =

American esoteric, theosophist and writer (1880–1949)

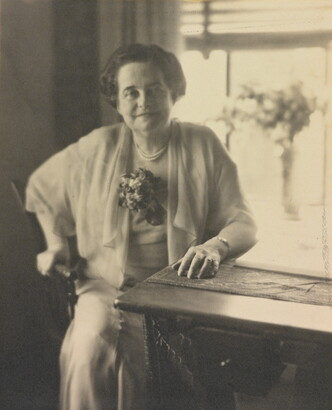
- Bailey in the 1940s
- Born: Alice La Trobe-Bateman; 16 June 1880; Manchester, England
- Died: 15 December 1949 (aged 69); New York City, United States
- Occupation: Esoteric author
- Spouses: Walter Evans (divorced) Foster Bailey (m. 1921)
- Children: 3

Alice Ann Bailey (16 June 1880 – 15 December 1949) was a British and American writer. She wrote about 25 books on Theosophy and was one of the first writers to use the term New Age. She was born Alice La Trobe-Bateman, in Manchester, England and moved to the United States in 1907, where she spent most of her life as a writer and teacher.

Bailey's works, written between 1919 and 1949, describe a wide-ranging neo-theosophical system of esoteric thought covering such topics as how spirituality relates to the Solar System, meditation, healing, spiritual psychology, the destiny of nations, and prescriptions for society in general. She described the majority of her work as having been telepathically dictated to her by a Master of Wisdom, initially referred to only as "the Tibetan" or by the initials "D.K.", later identified as Djwal Khul.

Her writings bore some similarity to those of Madame Blavatsky and are among the teachings often referred to as "Ageless Wisdom". Though Bailey's writings differ in some respects from the Theosophy of Blavatsky, they have much in common with it. She wrote on religious themes, including Christianity, though her writings are fundamentally different from many aspects of Christianity or other orthodox religions. Her vision of a unified society included a global "spirit of religion" different from traditional religious forms and including the concept of the Age of Aquarius.

== Biography ==
=== Childhood and early life ===
Bailey was born into a wealthy middle-class British family and, as a member of the Anglican Church, received a thorough Christian education.

Her autobiography states that at the age of 15, on 30 June 1895, Bailey was visited by a stranger, "...a tall man, dressed in European clothes and wearing a turban" who told her she needed to develop self-control to prepare for certain work he planned for her to do. This turned out to be the creation and publication of 19 books, together with educational and meditation work that reached "practically all the countries of the world".

At the age of 22, Bailey did evangelical work in connection with the YMCA and the British Army. This took her to India, where, in 1907, she met her future husband, Walter Evans. Together, they moved to America, where Evans became an Episcopal priest. The marriage did not last, and Bailey pushed for and received a divorce. She left with their three children after their formal separation in 1915. Then followed a difficult period in which she worked in a sardine cannery to support herself and the children.

=== With the Theosophical Society ===
The Society's seal incorporated the Swastika, Star of David, Ankh, Aum and Ouroboros symbols

Bailey discovered the Theosophical Society and the work of Helena Petrovna Blavatsky. The Theosophical Society states that Bailey became involved in 1917. Theosophist Joy Mills states that in 1918 she became a member of the Esoteric Section of the society. Theosophist Bruce F. Campbell notes, "She quickly rose to a position of influence in the American Section of the Adyar society, moving to its headquarters at Krotona in Hollywood. She became editor of its magazine, The Messenger, and member of the committee responsible for Krotona." In 1919, Foster Bailey (1888–1977), who was to be her second husband, became National Secretary of the Theosophical Society. They married in 1921.

The Theosophist published the first few chapters of her first work, Initiation, Human and Solar, (p. 762) but then stopped for reasons Bailey called "theosophical jealousy and reactionary attitude". Bailey "objected to the 'neo-Theosophy' of Annie Besant" and worked with Foster Bailey to gain more power in the American Section. According to Theosophist Josephine Maria Davies Ransom, she became part of a progressive "Back to Blavatsky movement, led mainly by Mr. and Mrs. Foster Bailey". She outlined her vision for the Esoteric Section of the Theosophical Society; however, her efforts to influence the society failed, and she and her husband were dismissed from their positions.

According to historian of religion Olav Hammer, Bailey's early writings on communications with the Tibetan were well received within the society, but society president Annie Besant questioned Bailey's claims of communications with "the Tibetan" and allowed the Baileys to be expelled from the organization. According to Bailey, she had come to see the society as authoritarian and involved with "lower psychic phenomena".

=== Lucis Trust ===
Alice and Foster Bailey founded the Lucis Trust in 1922. Its activities include the Arcane School, World Goodwill, Triangles, a quarterly magazine called The Beacon, and a publishing company primarily intended to publish Bailey's many books. The Arcane School gives instruction and guidance in meditation via correspondence based on the ideas in Bailey's books. World Goodwill is intended to promote better human relations through goodwill, which they define as "love in action". That "action" included the support of the United Nations.

The "Triangles" are groups of three people who agree to link up in thought each day and to meditate on right human relations, visualizing light and love pouring into human minds and hearts, followed by the use of the Great Invocation (see below). It is not necessary for each person to link in thought at the same time each day and it only takes a few moments of time. Alice and Foster Bailey founded "Lucifer Publishing Company" ("'Lucifer' and 'Lucis' come from the same word root, lucis being the Latin genitive case meaning of light).

After the first two or three years, the name was changed to "Lucis Publishing Co." The Theosophical Society also used the name "Lucifer" for its early magazine. In 1923, with the help of Foster Bailey, Alice Bailey founded the Arcane School, which is part of Lucis Trust. This school provides educational correspondence, meditation instruction, and guided study based on her writings.

Bailey continued to work up until the time of her death in 1949.

== Main ideas ==
=== The seven rays of energy ===
Bailey's writings includes a detailed exposition of the "seven rays" which are presented as the fundamental energies that are behind and exist throughout all manifestation. They are seen as the basic creative forces of the universe and emanations of Divinity that underlie the evolution of all things. The rays are described as related to human psychology, the destiny of nations, as well as the planets and stars of the heavens. The concept of the seven rays can be found in Theosophical works. Campbell writes that Bailey, "... was the first to develop the idea of the seven rays, although it can be found in germ in earlier Theosophical writings." The seven rays also appear in Hindu religious philosophy.

=== Esoteric astrology ===
Esoteric astrology is part of Alice Bailey's "Ageless Wisdom" teachings, which she said were relayed by her Tibetan Master Djwhal Khul.

The esoteric astrologers who follow the teachings of Bailey typically base their work on her five-volume Treatise on the Seven Rays, particularly volume three which focuses on astrology. Her esoteric astrology deals with the evolution of soul consciousness and the obstacles to that evolution.

=== Esoteric healing ===
Bailey's teaching on healing primarily concerns the relationship of soul to personality, of the spiritual to the material nature. In her view, all disease has its ultimate root in some type of blocked or inhibited soul life. Therefore, healing consists of releasing the soul, that is the establishing of a right relation between the soul and the personality where the personality is defined as the instrument of soul expression. Eliminating obstructions and congestion, the source of a major part of disease. The whole process of healing is directed by thought, the mind of the healer and sometimes emotional synergy to inhibit causes of disease. Healing becomes automatic where the practitioner no longer is directed by energies, currents, centers, that include the nadis as one area of focus, the abstract is related back to the practices where appropriate but healing is directed without effort.

=== The constitution of man ===
In line with previous Theosophical teachings, Bailey taught that man consists of

1. Monad (spark of God, true Self)
2. Soul (higher mind, Love nature, higher consciousness)
3. Personality consisting of three aspects
  - Lower mind (intellect)
  - Emotions or astral nature
  - Physical and etheric body

Each of the three aspects of the lower nature is described as a "body" or aura of energy and seen as partial expression of the real self or soul. The soul is regarded as the reflection of the real self that works through or uses the three aspects of personality. She also speaks of these as "vehicles" or "sheaths", and alternately as the "mental body", "astral body", or "physical body". The "etheric" body is most directly related to physical health and is seen as the vital energizing agent for the individual while in physical incarnation. (p. 172) (p. 33) See also: Subtle body. The mind and emotional nature are seen as auras. or energy fields of which brain activity is a secondary effect. (p. 411)

=== The Great Invocation ===
The Great Invocation is a mantra given in 1937 by Bailey. The mantra begins with "From the point of Light within the Mind of God, let light stream forth into the minds of men ..." with the rest of the passage expressing the ideas of love, the return of The Christ (Maitreya) and of men acting in accordance with the plan of God. Historian of occultism Mitch Horowitz has observed that, "Bailey's capacity to introduce an occult-inspired universalistic prayer into Western culture, The Great Invocation—recited over the radio by no less than Eleanor Roosevelt—attests to the iconoclastic messenger’s inroads.

The mantra is well known by some followers of the New Age movement, where it is widely used as part of meditation, particularly in groups. For instance, the invocation has been used in the Findhorn Foundation community since the 1970s. In response to the September 11 attacks (2001), the Great Invocation was used as a central element of a new daily program at Findhorn known as the "Network of Light meditations for peace".

Rosemary Keller described the Great Invocation as a call for "the Christ to return to Earth" and wrote that Bailey-related groups purchased radio and television time to broadcast the invocation as part of their mission, and that often the invocation was recited in what Keller called "light groups", to accomplish what Bailey's disciples considered to be attracting and focusing "spiritual energies to benefit the planet".

Alice Bailey's writings have a theme that generally advocates replacement of the old with the new and this occurs in connection with the Great Invocation as follows: "This new Invocation, if given widespread distribution, can be to the new world religion what the Lord's Prayer has been to Christianity and the 23rd Psalm has been to the spiritually minded Jew."

=== Discipleship and service ===
Bailey's writings downplayed traditional devotional and religious aspects of the spiritual life, in favor of a life of meditation, service to humanity, and cooperation with "the Plan of the Hierarchy". In her thinking, service, "... is a soul instinct ... innate and peculiar to soul unfoldment. It is the outstanding characteristic of the soul, just as desire is the outstanding characteristic of the lower nature ..."

=== Unity and divinity of nations and groups ===
Ross describes Bailey's teachings as emphasizing the "underlying unity of all forms of life", and the "essential oneness of all religions, of all departments of science, and of all the philosophies". Campbell notes that the New Group of World Servers was established for "... promotion of international understanding, economic sharing, and religious unity".

=== Comparison with Theosophy ===
Theosophists are divided on their assessment of Alice Bailey's writings. For instance, the noted contemporary Theosophical writer Geoffrey Hodson wrote a highly favorable review of one her books, saying, "Once more Alice Bailey has placed occult students in her debt." Olav Hammer writes, "Her first book, Initiation Human and Solar, was at first favorably received by her fellow theosophists. Soon her claims to be recipient of ageless wisdom from the Masters met with opposition."

The conflict is understandable since her works contain some criticisms of Theosophy, and at the time of the break she voiced her criticism of what she saw as dogmatic structures within the society, while questioning the pledges of loyalty to Theosophical leaders that were required. "During the annual convention of 1920 in Chicago, there was a power struggle between forces loyal to Besant and the Esoteric Section and others who believed that the latter had become too powerful. Below the surface was a hidden controversy regarding Alice's work with the Tibetan." For a more recent example of Bailey/Theosophy division, see Theosophy in Scandinavia.

Campbell writes that Bailey's books are a reworking of major Theosophical themes, with some distinctive emphases, and that they present a comprehensive system of esoteric science and occult philosophy, cognizant of contemporary social and political developments. Steven J. Sutcliffe points out that both Bailey and Blavatsky's work evoke a picture of Tibet as the spiritual home of the Masters and that Bailey claimed a more-or-less direct lineage to Blavatsky. He describes Bailey as a 'post-Theosophical' theorist, reporting that Bailey received instruction from "former personal pupils of Blavatsky" and notes that her third book (A Treatise on Cosmic Fire) not only reproduces Blavatsky's apocryphal Stanzas of Dzyan but is dedicated to Blavatsky, as well.

Parallels between Theosophy and Bailey are many, for instance, one principle of Theosophy, the Law of Attraction was discussed in esoteric writings by Blavatsky, Annie Besant, William Quan Judge, and others; and was also discussed in the writings of Alice Bailey, including a whole chapter in one of her books. The term has been embraced, in a simplified form, by the contemporary New Age movement and was popularized in the 2006 film The Secret.

Jon Klimo, in Investigations on Receiving Information from Paranormal Sources, writes, "As with Blavatsky/Theosophical material, and more recent contemporary channeled material from other sources, we find in the Bailey work the same occult cosmological hierarchy: physical, etheric, astral, mental, causal, and higher inhabited levels of existence." Olav Hammer, in the book Claiming Knowledge: Strategies of Epistemology from Theosophy to the New Age, highlights Bailey's Theosophical similarities as well as noting what he thinks are some differences between them: "To a large extent, Bailey's teachings are a restatement and amplification of theosophy of the Secret Doctrine. Bailey inherited from Blavatsky and Leadbeater a predilection for profuse details and complex classificatory schemes. ... Her books have also introduced shifts in emphasis as well as new doctrinal elements."

Some Theosophical critics have contended that there are major differences between Bailey's ideas and the Theosophy of Blavatsky, such as Bailey's embrace of some mystical Christian terms and concepts and her acceptance of Charles Webster Leadbeater.

Nicholas Weeks, writing for the Theosophical magazine Fohat in 1997, felt Bailey's assertion that "... her teachings are grounded in and do not oppose in any fundamental way Theosophy as lived and taught by HPB and her Gurus" was false. Her books are in fact "rooted in the pseudo-theosophy pioneered by C. W. Leadbeater." He stated Bailey accepted Leadbeater's "fantasy" of the return of Christ and disparaged Bailey's Great Invocation, a prayer supposed to "induce Christ and his Masters to leave their hidden ashrams [and] enter into major cities" to lead the Aquarian Age. This contrasts with the Theosophy of Blavatsky, he says, which emphasizes reliance on "the Christos principle within each person".

=== Ideas about races and evolution ===
Bailey described a concept of racial differentiation that posited a division of humanity into races that are on different levels in a "ladder of evolution". These races do not represent a national or physical type but a stage of evolution. For example, she states that the Aryan root race (or '5th race'), is an "emerging new race" and so a relatively new evolutionary phenomenon. She stated that this newer type is forming in every land but primarily in lands where Caucasian peoples are found and indicates a culture where thought or intellect is dominant. She stated that as evolution proceeds, things are accelerated and humanity will soon be predominantly distinguished by the Aryan consciousness. "I speak not in terms of the Aryan race as it is generally understood today or in its Nordic implications."

In her book Education in the New Age, Bailey made predictions about the use of this esoteric racial concept in the schools of the future and that these schools would incorporate the idea of "root races". These races are a way of conceptualizing evolution as it occurs over vast prehistoric spans of time, and during which humanity developed body (Lemurian), emotion (Atlantean), and mind (Aryan). She states that there is now being developed a "new race" with a spiritual dimension that expresses as "group qualities and consciousness and idealistic vision".

She stated that this new development may take many thousands of years and may therefore not be the quick advance some of her New Age followers wish for. In her The Destiny of the Nations, Bailey described a process by which this "new race" will evolve, after which "very low grade human bodies will disappear, causing a general shift in the racial types toward a higher standard." For Bailey, the evolution of humanity was intimately bound up with its relationship to this Spiritual Hierarchy. She believed that the influences of religions, philosophies, sciences, educational movements, and human culture in general are the result of this relationship.

==== Criticism of her ideas on races ====
Bailey's ideas about race were criticized by Victor Shnirelman, a cultural anthropologist and ethnographer, who in a survey of modern Neopaganism in Russia, drew particular attention to "... groups [that] take an extremely negative view of multi-culturalism, object to the 'mixture' of kinds, [and] support isolationism and the prohibition of immigration." Shnirelman saw some of Bailey's ideas on race as similar to the racism he perceived in the writing of Julius Evola, saying that "... racist and antisemitic trends are explicit, for example, in the occult teachings of Alice Bailey and her followers, who wish to cleanse Christianity of its "Jewish inheritance" and reject the "Jewish Bible" as a prerequisite for entering the Age of Aquarius."

Shnirelman's view was echoed by Isaac Lubelsky who criticized not only Bailey, but Blavatsky, Steiner, and others. In Lubelsky's view, racists ideas were common to the whole "Theosophical family".

Monica Sjöö, a Swedish painter, writer and a radical anarcho/eco-feminist wrote that Bailey, through her published teachings, had a "reactionary and racist influence on the whole New Age movement." She also noted what she called Bailey's and Theosophy's "pro-fascist religious views", such as the belief in a secret elite of "Masters" who influence world events and human minds through occult means and attempt to bring about the evolution of an Aryan race. Although this is an understandably modern misunderstanding of her teaching – 'Aryan' as used by Bailey is easily confused with the modern terminology, and the "Masters" are not an elite, but instead are 'enlightened' individuals originally introduced in theosophy as having evolved beyond the human or "4th kingdom" into the fifth or "Kingdom of souls", and who – in her view – guide the human race as a whole.

Controversy has arisen around some of Bailey's statements on nationalism, American isolationism, Soviet totalitarianism, Fascism, Zionism, Nazism, race relations, Africans, Jews, and the religions of Judaism and Christianity. Yonassan Gershom and others have claimed that her writings contain racist material.

The American Chassidic author Yonassan Gershom wrote that Bailey's plan for a New World Order and her call for "the gradual dissolution—again if in any way possible—of the Orthodox Jewish faith" revealed that "her goal is nothing less than the destruction of Judaism itself." Gershom also wrote that "This stereotyped portrayal of Jews is followed by a hackneyed diatribe against the Biblical Hebrews, based upon the "angry Jehovah" theology of nineteenth-century Protestantism. Jews do not, and never have, worshipped an angry vengeful god, and we Jews never, ever call God 'Jehovah'."

Researcher Hannah Newman described what she found to be an antisemitic element in the Great Invocation. According to Newman, "the Plan" named in the invocation refers to the plan authored by "the Hierarchy", that Newman states places "high priority on removing all Jewish presence and influence from human consciousness, a goal to be achieved by eliminating Judaism." (Note: A commentary on the Great Invocation on Lucis Trust's website says "Christ emphasised ever the Fatherhood of God and substituted it in place of the cruel, jealous tribal Jehovah." See also Marcionism.)

=== On organized religions ===
Bailey taught a form of universal spirituality that transcended denominational identification, believing that, "Every class of human beings is a group of brothers. Catholics, Jews, Gentiles, occidentals and orientals are all the sons of God." She stated that all religions originate from the same spiritual source, and that humanity will eventually come to realize this, and as they do so, the result will be the emergence of a universal world religion and a "new world order".

Author Steven Sutcliffe wrote that Bailey's "World Goodwill" organization was promoting groups of "world servers" to, as he quotes Bailey, "serve the Plan, Humanity, the Hierarchy and the Christ".

Despite her focus on unity of religion, Bromley and Hammond point out that Bailey and other "occultists" "... hammered home the central idea, 'The East is the true home of spiritual knowledge and occult wisdom'."

== Influence ==
=== Groups founded by Bailey or her followers ===
The Arcane School, founded by Alice and Foster Bailey to disseminate spiritual teachings, organizes a worldwide "Triangles" program to bring people together in groups of three, for daily meditation and study. Their belief is that they receive divine energy through meditation and that this energy is transmitted to humanity, so raising spiritual awareness. John Michael Greer's New Encyclopedia of the Occult states that the school "seeks to develop a New Group of World Servers to accomplish the work of the Hierarchy of Masters, under the guidance of its head, the Christ."

=== Influence on the New Age movement ===
Bailey made extensive use of the term "New Age" in her books and some writers have described her as the founder of the New Age movement, although The New Age was used as the title of a Journal of Christian liberalism and Socialism, published as early as 1894, predating Bailey's use of the term.

James R. Lewis and J. Gordon Melton, in Perspectives on the New Age wrote, "The most important—though certainly not the only—source of this transformative metaphor, as well as the term "New Age", was Theosophy, particularly as the Theosophical perspective was mediated to the movement by the works of Alice Bailey."

Sir John Sinclair, in his book The Alice Bailey Inheritance, commented on the seminal influence of Alice Bailey, which, he said, underlies the consciousness growth movement in the 20th century.

=== Influence on neopaganism ===
Several writers have mentioned the affinity of some of Bailey's concepts with modern expressions of paganism.

During the 1960s and 1970s, the neopagan author and ceremonial magic ritualist Caroll Poke Runyon published a magazine called The Seventh Ray, its name taken from the writings of Alice Bailey. Three volumes of collected articles from the magazine were published as The Seventh Ray Book I, The Blue Ray, The Seventh Ray Book II, the Red Ray and The Seventh Ray Book III, the Green Ray.

In contrast to this, Daren Kemp in Handbook to the New Age sees critical differences between neopaganism and New Age movements and indicates that it is a mistake to conflate them.

=== Influence on women in religion ===
Author Catherine Wessinger wrote that Bailey was a liberated woman "... sixty years before it became popular" and that Bailey's books expressed a similar "millennial view" to the works of Annie Besant. Wessinger stated that they were "an important source of the contemporary New Age movement."

According to the Encyclopedia of Women And Religion in North America, several leaders of New Age philosophy have further developed Bailey's teachings, including the well-known personalities JZ Knight (who purports to channel the entity known by the name Ramtha), Helen Schucman (author of A Course in Miracles purportedly through the process of telepathic dictation she called "scribing"), and Elizabeth Clare Prophet, who published what she referred to as "dictations from Ascended Masters". These developments have been referred to by other sources as "spin-offs" and splinter groups." (p. 65) (p. 557)

The differences between Theosophy, Bailey and Elizabeth Clare Prophet can be noted in connection with Elizabeth Clare Prophet's radical concepts of catastrophic change and survivalism, including the building of fall-out shelters. (p. 81) The validity of the Elizabeth Clare Prophet's writings was "... disputed by Theosophical writers".

The many claims and teachings of the spin-off groups underscores their divergences, for example there appears to be a widespread confusion about the phrase and meaning of "Ascendant Master" in that it was adopted by Mark and Elizabeth Prophet but not by Theosophists or Alice Bailey. (p. 111) The concepts and language have been conflated in the popular mind.

=== Influence on psychotherapy and healing ===
In 1930, with the patronage of English-Dutch spiritualist, theosophist and scholar Olga Froebe-Kapteyn, Bailey established the short-lived "School of Spiritual Research" located on Froebe-Kapteyn's estate, Casa Gabriella, in Switzerland. In 1932 the school was closed because of personal conflict between Bailey and Froebe-Kapteyn, at which time Froebe-Kapteyn replaced it with the Eranos group.

Roberto Assagioli, founder of Psychosynthesis, was a lecturer at School of Spiritual Research. He continued a close association with Bailey during the 1930s; some of his writings were published in Bailey's magazine The Beacon; and he was a trustee of Bailey's organization, the Lucis Trust. He had developed his approach to psychology, called Psychosynthesis, beginning in 1910. His methods were later influenced by some elements of Bailey's work. However, authors John Firman and Ann Gila write that Assagioli kept what he referred to as a "wall of silence" between the areas of psychosynthesis and religion or metaphysics, insisting that they not be conflated with each other.

Roger J. Woolger said, in a paper presented to the "Beyond the Brain" Conference held at Cambridge University in 1999, "In Tansley as in Brennan you will find descriptions of a hierarchy of subtle bodies called the etheric, emotional, mental and spiritual that surround the physical body. (Tansley attributed the source of his model to Alice Bailey's theosophical commentary on The Yoga Sutras of Patanjali, the locus classicus of Hindu teaching.)"

Bailey's influence can be found in therapeutic communities with which she was never directly involved, such as the Human Potential Movement. She was also cited in THERAPEUTIC TOUCH: Healing Science or Psychic Midwife? by Sharon Fish.

=== Influence on UFO groups ===
Alice Bailey makes no reference to unidentified flying objects. This is not surprising since Alice Bailey's books were written between 1919 and 1949 and "the emergence of religion specifically focused on UFOs is a post-1947 phenomena." But she did speak of Masters as having evolved beyond the human level, and expounded a cosmology of a living universe in which even planets and stars are regarded as living entities. These ideas may partially account for an association in minds of some between Bailey, and others of the Theosophical schools, and UFOs. For instance, Christopher Partridge wrote of this association as "easily transferred". The connection does exist in the sense that there is a subset of persons interested in both esoteric writings and UFOs and who link them as shown by the fact that some books that cite Alice Bailey or Theosophy also cite UFOs.

Christopher Partridge wrote that the works of Bailey, Rudolf Steiner, and Theosophy in general all influenced what he called the "UFO religions". He explained that "... Theosophy has several prominent branches, and, strictly speaking, the branch which has had the most important influence on the UFO religion is that developed by Alice Bailey". Partridge also quoted Gordon Melton, who suggested that the first UFO religion was Guy Ballard's "I Am" Activity, which Bailey described as a "cheap comedy".

Professor Robert S. Ellwood of the University of Southern California investigated a wide range of religious and spiritual groups in the United States during the 1970s, including a nationwide group of UFO believers called Understanding, Inc., which had been founded by a contactee named Daniel Fry. He reported that, "There is no particular religious practice connected with the meeting, although the New Age Prayer derived from the Alice Bailey writings is used as an invocation."

New religious movement scholar George D. Chryssides cited Bailey's influence on the ideas of the notorious Order of the Solar Temple cult and related New Age groups, writing that it is "hard to overestimate Bailey’s influence on the Solar Temple". In particular, the preoccupation with the star Sirius and her emphasis on the theosophical concept of the Ascended Masters gave a momentum to the contemporary revival of Rosicrucianism; group leader Joseph Di Mambro would also utilize her Great Invocation to begin Solar Temple ceremonies. A related figure, French esotericist Jacques Breyer, would also draw heavily from Bailey's ideas.

== In popular culture ==
Lou Reed of the Velvet Underground was a devoted reader of Bailey's work, especially her book A Treatise on White Magic, which he urged on others. Author Ryan H. Walsh suggests that that book had an influence on the Velvet's second album, White Light/White Heat.

In 1975, Todd Rundgren released an album titled Initiation which has a song called "Initiation" on side one. The title of the album is apparently based on the Theosophical concept of initiation taught by Alice A. Bailey and C.W. Leadbeater. The entire second side of the album is taken up by a song called "A Treatise on Cosmic Fire"; the three parts of the song are listed as: "I. The Internal Fire, or Fire by Friction; II. The Fire of Spirit, or Electric Fire; The Fire of Mind, or Solar Fire." The second parts of these three phrases are taken directly from Alice A. Bailey's book A Treatise on Cosmic Fire.

Also in 1975, Rundgren released an album by his side-project Utopia titled Another Live. This album contained a song titled "The Seven Rays" (see reference above). In 1977, Rundgren followed up with another Bailey reference with a song entitled "Love in Action" from the Utopia album Oops! Wrong Planet. Love in Action was the concept promoted by Bailey's and Foster Bailey's "World Goodwill" organization.

In 1982, Bailey's influence appeared in pop culture, with the release of Van Morrison's album Beautiful Vision, in which he directly referred to the teachings and the Tibetan in the lyrics of the songs "Dweller on the Threshold" and "Aryan Mist". Morrison also used the phrase "world of glamour", reminiscent of Bailey's Glamour: A World Problem, in the songs "Ivory Tower" and "Green Mansions". The song "Ancient of Days" from the 1984 Sense of Wonder album appears to be a reference to a Bailey concept found in such books as The Externalization of the Hierarchy. Alice A. Bailey and the Tibetan's Glamour: A World Problem is also directly cited in the liner notes to Morrison's album Inarticulate Speech of the Heart.

== Bibliography ==
The Lucis Trust Publishing Company and the Lucis Press Limited are the official publishers of Alice Bailey's books.

=== Credited to Alice Bailey ===
Works containing the prefatory Extract from a Statement by the Tibetan, generally taken to indicate the book was a "received" work.

- Bailey, Alice (1922). Initiation, Human and Solar. Lucis Publishing Company. ISBN 978-0-85330-110-3.
- Bailey, Alice (1922). Letters on Occult Meditation. Lucis Publishing Company. ISBN 978-0-85330-111-0.
- Bailey, Alice A. (1925). A Treatise on Cosmic Fire. Lucis Publishing Company. ISBN 978-0-85330-117-2.
- Bailey, Alice (1997) [1927]. The Light of the Soul: Its Science and Effect: A Paraphrase of the Yoga Sutras of Patanjali. Lucis Publishing Company. ISBN 978-0-85330-112-7.
- Bailey, Alice (1987) [1934]. A Treatise on White Magic, or, The Way of the Disciple (5 ed.). Lucis Publishing Company. ISBN 978-0-85330-123-3.
- Bailey, Alice A.; Khul, Djwhal (1944). Discipleship in the New Age I. Lucis Publishing Company. ISBN 978-0-85330-103-5.
- Bailey, Alice A.; Khul, Djwhal (1955). Discipleship in the New Age II. Lucis Publishing Company. ISBN 978-0-85330-104-2.
- Bailey, Alice (1944). The Problems of Humanity. Lucis Publishing Company. ISBN 978-0-85330-113-4.
- Bailey, Alice (1947). The Reappearance of the Christ. Lucis Publishing Company. ISBN 978-0-85330-114-1.
- Bailey, Alice (1949). The Destiny of the Nations. Lucis Publishing Company. ISBN 978-0-85330-102-8.
- Bailey, Alice (1950). Glamour: A World Problem. Lucis Publishing Company. ISBN 978-0-85330-109-7.
- Bailey, Alice; Khul, Djwhal (1950). Telepathy and the Etheric Vehicle. Lucis Publishing Company. ISBN 978-0-85330-116-5.
- Bailey, Alice (1954). Education in the New Age. Lucis. ISBN 978-0-85330-105-9.
- Bailey, Alice A.; Khul, Djwhal (1957). The Externalisation of the Hierarchy. Lucis Publishing Company. ISBN 978-0-85330-106-6.
- Bailey, Alice A. (2003). Ponder on This (compilation). Lucis Publishing Company. ISBN 978-0-85330-131-8.
- A Treatise on the Seven Rays:
  - Bailey, Alice A.; Khul, Djwhal (1936). Volume 1: Esoteric Psychology I. ISBN 978-0-85330-118-9.
  - Bailey, Alice A.; Khul, Djwhal (1942). Volume 2: Esoteric Psychology II. ISBN 978-0-85330-119-6.
  - Volume 3: Esoteric Astrology. 1951. ISBN 978-0-85330-120-2.
  - Bailey, Alice Anne (1953). Volume 4: Esoteric Healing. Lucis Publishing Company Lucis Press. ISBN 978-0-85330-121-9.
  - Bailey, Alice A.; Khul, Djwhal (1960). Volume 5: The Rays and the Initiations. ISBN 978-0-85330-122-6.

=== Credited to Alice A. Bailey alone ===
Works in which Bailey claimed sole authorship of the material.

- Bailey, Alice (1922). The Consciousness of the Atom. Lucis Publishing Company. ISBN 978-0-85330-101-1.
- Bailey, Alice (1930). The Soul and Its Mechanism. Lucis Publishing Company. ISBN 978-0-85330-115-8.
- Bailey, Alice A. (1932). From Intellect to Intuition. Lucis Publishing Company. ISBN 978-0-85330-108-0.
- Bailey, Alice A. (1937). From Bethlehem to Calvary. ISBN 978-0-85330-107-3.
- Between War and Peace. 1942. (No ISBN. Published by Lucis Publishing Company)
- Bailey, Alice A. (1951). The Unfinished Autobiography. Lucis Publishing Company. ISBN 978-0-85330-124-0.
- Bailey, Alice A. (1974) [1957]. The Labours of Hercules. Lucis Publishing Companies. ISBN 978-0-85330-137-0.

=== Biography ===
- Blackthorn, Isobel (2020). Alice A. Bailey: Life and Legacy. Independently Published. ISBN 979-8-63575-990-5.

== See also ==
- Agni Yoga
- Annie Besant
- Helena Petrovna Blavatsky
- Esoteric cosmology
- Benjamin Creme
- Esoteric healing
- List of spirituality-related topics
- Lucis Trust
- Magic and religion
- New World Order
- Planes of existence
- Reincarnation
- Helena Roerich
- Western mystery tradition
