= List of esoteric healing articles =

Esoteric healing refers to numerous types of alternative medicine which aim to heal disease and disability, using esoteric means, either through faith and human will, or by using pseudoscientific processes. It was first published in the 1950s and was initially inspired by Djwal Khul and Alice Bailey.

== Healing ==
- Alice Bailey § Esoteric healing
- Christian Science § Healing practices
- Crystal healing
- Dianetics
- Energy medicine
- Faith healing
- Gifts of healing
- Johrei
- Laying on of hands
- Liu Zi Jue
- Musica universalis
- Prana
- Prayer § Prayer healing
- Psychic surgery
- Qi § Role in traditional Chinese medicine
- Qigong
- Quantum healing
- Radionics
- Reiki
- Royal touch
- Therapeutic touch
- ThetaHealing
- Universal Medicine
- Word of Faith § Healing

== See also ==
- Energy (esotericism)
- Folk healer
- Healing revival
- Inner Healing Movement
- Long Healing Prayer
- Medicine man (Native American)
- Quackery
- Quantum mysticism
- Scientific skepticism
- Shamanism
- Traditional medicine
- Witch doctor
- World Healing Day
