= Share International =

Non-profit religious organization

Share International Foundation
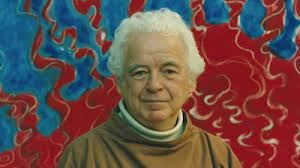
- Benjamin Creme (1922–2016)
- Formation: 1974 (Transmission Meditation groups)
- Founder: Benjamin Creme
- Type: Non-profit organization
- Headquarters: London, England
- Region served: Worldwide (sister organizations in Amsterdam, Tokyo, and Berkeley, California)
- Founder: Benjamin Creme (1922–2016)
- Affiliations: Alice Bailey/Arcane School teachings; Theosophy

Share International Foundation is a non-profit organization in London founded by Benjamin Creme (1922–2016) with sister organizations in Amsterdam, Tokyo, and Berkeley, California. From their 'about us' page, Share International describes the group as: "A worldwide network of individuals... whose purpose is to make known the fact that Maitreya ― the World Teacher for the coming age ― and his group, the Masters of Wisdom, are now among us..."

According to Share International, Maitreya, a great Avatar (which means "coming down from far away" in Sanskrit), has been living among the Asian community in London since 19 July 1977, and presently is in the process of emerging publicly worldwide.

== Beliefs, practices and background ==
Benjamin Creme was a student of the esoteric teachings of Alice Bailey, Helena Blavatsky and Helena Roerich. Share International's lectures and publications further these authors' ideas about Maitreya (meaning "kindliness or compassion" in Sanskrit). According to the Ageless Wisdom Teachings, the Advent of Maitreya fulfills not only Buddhist prophecies about the appearance of a future great teacher named Maitreya, but also the prophecies of a number of other world religions ― including those of Christianity (the Second Coming of Christ), Hinduism (the Kalki avatar of Vishnu), Islam (the Imam Mahdi) and Judaism (the Jewish Messiah). Creme claimed that Maitreya was actually Jesus's teacher, and Maitreya manifested through (or overshadowed) Jesus 2,000 years ago.

Share International does not claim Maitreya as a religious leader, nor that he comes to found a new religion, but that he comes as a guide and teacher. Principally the World Teacher is said to be here to teach the science of human evolution and the art of self-realization. He also returns to help safely deliver and renew humanity as the planet transitions from one epoch to another (i.e., from the Age of Pisces with its focus on emotions, desire, individualism and competition, to the Age of Aquarius, when unity in diversity becomes prized along with cooperation and group synthesis). Share International underscores that despite the great societal, political, economic and environmental upheavals that characterize our time, Maitreya has confidence that humanity can resolve its problems. This could be achieved through something that has never yet been attempted on a grand scale: through sharing the world's resources more equitably. After "the Day of Declaration", the group contends that Maitreya will call to action people everywhere to save the hundreds of millions who go hungry or who are starving in a world where there are food surpluses, where food is hoarded to inflate prices, and where a great amount of food is wasted. Maitreya's solutions include convincing mankind that people need to embrace living more simply, that war must be renounced and that, in general, there must be a shift in priorities worldwide ― such that adequate food, clothing, housing, education and medical care be deemed universal human rights. Maitreya has been stated as saying, "Take your brother's need as the measure of your actions and solve the problems of the world. There is no other course."

Nonetheless, Creme was generally reluctant to share the exact details about Maitreya's appearances on television and elsewhere ― as he stated that Maitreya discouraged people from chasing after him, and that no one could own him. Creme did confirm however that on 11 June 1988, Maitreya had appeared before 6000 Kenyans in an outdoor church before 6000 people where he spoke perfect Swahili for 18 minutes before disappearing, as had been reported in the Kenya Times. Both CNN and the BBC reported on this event, including the fact that many miraculous healings occurred there.

In addition, Benjamin Creme began teaching "Transmission Meditation" as early as 1974, offering it as a means of pooling positive, spiritual energy for the benefit of Humanity. In Transmission Meditation, groups sit silently receiving spiritual energy 'stepped-down' and transmitted through them by the Masters of Wisdom (also called by some groups Ascended Masters). This group meditation is both a means of accelerating one's spiritual development and a form of service, in contrast to other types of meditation that focus solely on relaxation, physical restoration, mitigating stress or optimizing cognition.

In the late 1970s, Creme recorded messages from Maitreya directly through a process called "mental overshadowing". One hundred and forty messages were recorded and later published under the title, Messages from Maitreya the Christ. On 31 January 1978, Creme voiced this message, which he attributed to Maitreya, "My task is a simple one: to show you the way. You, my friends, have the difficult task of building a New World, a New Country, a New Truth; but together we shall triumph."

Before his death, Creme increasingly described the Emergence as a gradual and intentional process rather than a distinctive event, as, according to Creme, Maitreya and the Masters of Wisdom are reluctant to infringe Humanity's free will.

== Creme and the press ==
Creme maintained that Maitreya descended from his ancient retreat in the Himalayas in 1977 and relocated to the Indian-Pakistani community of London. Journalists, in particular, were invited to find Maitreya in the Brick Lane area, as Creme underscored the importance of journalists, stating they have long served as witnesses and representatives of both ordinary people and great events, serving as both the voice and the conscience of the people. The journalists and media outlets at the time, however, demonstrated little or no interest in investigating or publishing content about Maitreya (i.e., not merely about the Emergence, but also about Maitreya’s plans and priorities).

Undaunted, Creme continued until his death in October 2016 to assert that Maitreya's full, public emergence was “imminent”. In this sense, Creme was harkening back to prophecies as ancient as those purported by the Bhagavad Gita (Book IV, Sutra 7, 8) itself:

“Whenever there is a withering of the law and an uprising of lawlessness on all sides, then I manifest Myself.”

“For the salvation of the righteous and the destruction of such as do evil, for the firm establishing of the Law, I come to birth age after age.”

== Share International Magazine ==
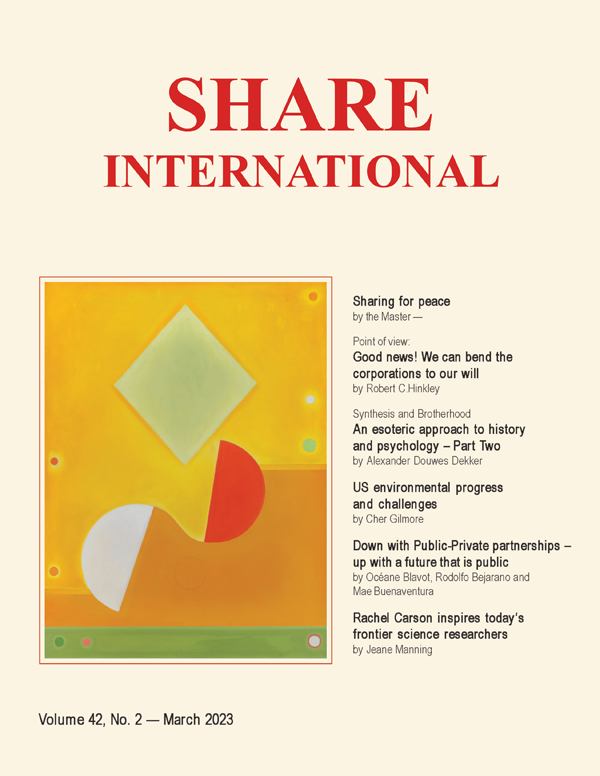
The March 2023 issue of Share International, with its cover featuring one of Benjamin Creme's pieces of artwork

Share International publishes a monthly magazine, also called Share International, which brings together ancient ways of knowing and contemporary thinking. It considers the causes underlying social, economic, political, and spiritual changes now occurring on a global scale, while seeking to inspire practical and compassionate action, such as activism, social justice, integrous journalism, as well as planetary healing. At present, the magazine is available for free on their international website at: share-international.org.

== Reception and criticisms ==
According to the American religious scholar J. Gordon Melton, Creme's statements served as a catalyst for assessment of the New Age movement by evangelical Christians. A week after the advertisements in 1982, other advertisements appeared in the Los Angeles Times denouncing Creme as an instrument of the Antichrist. Constance Cumbey, an evangelical Christian lawyer and a fierce, early critic of the New Age Movement, held that "Maitreya" was a pseudonym for the Antichrist and regarded Share International as a "Luciferian movement" (as Creme claimed that Lucifer was the esoteric name of a great being who encompasses the human kingdom or the oversoul of humanity, while the Ageless Wisdom teachings refer to all "fallen angels" as great cosmic beings who literally sacrifice themselves to create lesser life forms, such as humanity). Other Christian evangelicals distanced themselves from Cumbey's conspiracy theory.

British journalist Mick Brown wrote "I came to enjoy my talks with Mr. Creme. His stories of the Hierarchy, of hidden retreats in Tibet, of... the cogs... guiding the planet towards an age of harmony and enlightenment ..." He described Creme as a humorous figure and his claims as fantastical.

== See also ==
- Aetherius Society
- Master Jesus
- Theosophy
