= Neo-Theosophy =

System of Theosophical ideas

Neo-Theosophy is a term, originally derogatory, used by the followers of Helena Blavatsky to denominate the system of Theosophical ideas expounded by Annie Besant and Charles Webster Leadbeater following the death of Madame Blavatsky in 1891. This material differed in major respects from Blavatsky's original presentation, but it is accepted as genuinely Theosophical by many Theosophists around the world.

Main innovations of post-Blavatsky Theosophy as expounded by Besant and Leadbeater were the focus on exploring past lives and the astral plane using clairvoyance, the promotion of the young Indian boy Krishnamurti as the vehicle of the coming "World Teacher" and the introduction of Catholicism and its religious rituals in the form of the Liberal Catholic Church.

== Overview ==
After Blavatsky died in 1891, William Quan Judge became involved in a dispute with Henry Steel Olcott and Annie Besant over Judge allegedly forging letters from the Mahatmas. As a result, he ended his association with Olcott and Besant during 1895 and took most of the Society's American Section with him. He managed his new organization for about a year until his death in New York City, whereupon Katherine Tingley became manager. The organization originating from the faction of Olcott and Besant is based in India and known as the Theosophical Society - Adyar, while the organization managed by Judge is known nowadays simply as the Theosophical Society, but often with the specification, "international headquarters, Pasadena, California." The Theosophical Society - Adyar is the group denounced as Neo-Theosophy by those who are followers of William Q. Judge and the original teachings of Madame Blavatsky; they do not accept what they regard as the Neo-Theosophical teachings of Annie Besant, Henry Olcott, and C. W. Leadbeater.

The term Neo-Theosophy was coined by F.T.Brooks in 1914 in a book called Neo Theosophy Exposed, the second part of an earlier book called The Theosophical Society and its Esoteric Bogeydom. Around 1924, Margaret Thomas published a book called Theosophy Versus Neo-Theosophy. This book, now available online, presents a detailed critical comparison of Blavatskyian Theosophy and Neo-Theosophy.

G. R. S. Mead who was also highly critical of the clairvoyant researches of Besant and Leadbeater, remaining loyal to Blavatskyian Theosophy, also used the term Neo-Theosophy to refer to Besant's movement. For him "Theosophy" meant the wisdom element in the great world religions and philosophies.

Later, the term Neo-Theosophical came to be used outside Theosophical circles to refer to groups formed by former Theosophists as well as groups whose central premises borrow heavily from Blavatskyian Theosophy. Robert S. Ellwood, in his 1973 book Religious and Spiritual Groups in Modern America referred to organizations that had been formed by former Theosophists as "devolutions of Theosophy" and included in his survey "Neo-Gnostic groups and Neo-Rosicrucian groups [...] the Anthroposophy of Rudolf Steiner, [...] Alice Bailey's groups, (Guy Ballard's) "I AM" Activity and Max Heindel's Rosicrucianism. In a later book, Alternative Altars (1979) Professor Ellwood added;

Alice Bailey (1880 - 1949), founder of the Arcane School and the Full Moon Meditation Groups, and Guy Ballard (1878 - 1930), of the "I AM" movement, are representative of those who have started activities based on new and special communications from Theosophical Masters.

The author Daryl S. Paulson associates "Neo-Theosophy" with Alice Bailey.

Other neo-Theosophists include Steiner's contemporary Peter Deunov and Samael Aun Weor, who introduced theosophical teachings to Latin America. Dion Fortune and Aleister Crowley were also influencers of (and influenced by) the leading edge of the theosophical movement, which in turn influenced Anton LaVey's Satanism, L. Ron Hubbard's Scientology, Wicca, and the modern New Age and New Thought movements. (Alice Bailey introduced the term New Age).

== Neo-Theosophists today ==
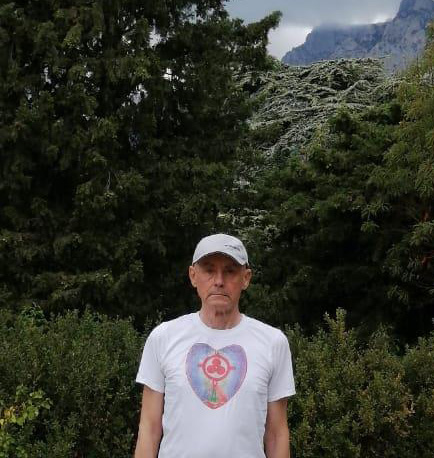
Victor Skumin

Some examples of Neo-Theosophists today include Benjamin Creme, Douglas Baker and Victor Skumin.

In 1990, Skumin elaborated on the theosophical conceptions of spiritual evolution and proposed a classification of Homo spiritalis (Latin: spiritual man), the sixth root race.

== See also ==
- Agni Yoga
- Benjamin Creme
- Helena Roerich
- New religious movement
- Nicholas Roerich
- Rudolf Steiner
- Victor Skumin
