= Maitreya (Theosophy) =

Esoteric spiritual entity

In Theosophy, Maitreya is considered the most advanced of spiritual beings, along with the Buddha, both from Earth and on Earth (apart from the Logos, the spiritual being who ensouls the planet itself). Maitreya is noteworthy, too, because he is considered the head of the Fifth Kingdom, the group of enlightened beings who make up the Masters of the Ancient Wisdom. According to Theosophy, the Masters of Wisdom are great human beings (both known and unknown), who have mastered their bodies, their emotions and their minds in previous incarnations, and who have remained behind in bodies of light to help humanity. Considered the spiritual government or esoteric hierarchy of our planet, these great beings focus on accelerating human evolution, which entails each individual pursuing both self-mastery and self-realization.

== Development of the Theosophical concept of Maitreya ==
The first mention of Maitreya in a Theosophical context occurs in the 1883 work Esoteric Buddhism by Alfred Percy Sinnett (1840–1921), an early Theosophical writer. The concepts described by Sinnett were amended, elaborated, and greatly expanded in The Secret Doctrine (published 1888), a major work by Helena Blavatsky (1831–1891), a founder of the Theosophical Society and contemporary Theosophy. In it, the messianic Maitreya is linked to both Buddhist and Hindu religious traditions. Moreover, the Theosophical teachings emphasize that the Christ is not a person but a role, that of the World Teacher.

=== Maitreya and the spiritual hierarchy ===
Maitreya is said to be the head of a group of enlightened beings, called the Masters of Wisdom, who make up the kingdom above humanity (that of the fifth kingdom). Having mastered their bodies, emotions, and minds over hundreds of thousands of lifetimes, they serve as the self-sacrificing guardians and intermediaries between humanity and the planetary logos, helping implement Earth's evolutionary process, known in Theosophical cosmology as the doctrine of Planetary Rounds. According to Theosophists, the occult or spiritual aspects of evolution are deemed far more important than the physical. Theosophists claim that the entire cosmos is in a state of evolutionary flux or continuous development, with planets being considered living, evolving beings in themselves. Cyclically, with the dawning of each astrological cycle, a world teacher ushers in a new age (e.g., the Age of Aquarius), and accordingly helps humanity to learn certain lessons and to grow more conscious.

According to Theosophical texts, Maitreya positions. himself in the current stage of planetary evolution as a Boddhisatva, or a being that acts from utter self-sacrifice. (This is a role widely esteemed among Buddhists.) Although this position is based on self-abnegation, it is considered an exalted one. At this evolutionary level, Maitreya is reputedly below only two others in the current hierarchy: at its apex, the Sanat Kumara (referred to as "The Lord of the World"), followed by the Buddha. Maitreya is additionally described as having responsibilities furthering the plan for the planet itself, a plan that considers the development of all beings. In Theosophy all things are considered animate or living for they are imbued with God’s energy. Nonetheless, Theosophists submit to the belief that God cannot be fully fathomed by any human being or religion.

When writing about the Masters or "the Mahātmās" Blavatsky claimed that the Theosophical Society, itself, was the product of one of the hierarchy's cyclical "impulses" aimed at fostering Humankind's evolution. Blavatsky further commented in her 1889 work, The Key to Theosophy, about the next quickening of human development, defining it as the "effort of the XXth century" which would involve another "torch bearer of Truth". She contended that the Theosophical Society was poised to play a major role in this effort, beyond merely an educational one. she prophesied that the Masters of Wisdom as well as their head, Maitreya, would be emerging publicly and playing more public roles worldwide, acting as counselors, mentors and wise teachers—not merely as hidden guides.

=== Maitreya's manifestations ===
In Theosophical texts, Maitreya is said to have had numerous manifestations or incarnations: in the theorized ancient continent of Atlantis; as a Hierophant in Ancient Egypt; as the Hindu deity Krishna; as a high priest in Ancient India; and as Christ during the three years of the Ministry of Jesus.

=== Maitreya's reappearance ===
Annie Besant (1847–1933), another well-known and influential Theosophist (and future President of the Society), had also developed an interest in this area of Theosophy. In the decades of the 1890s and 1900s, along with Charles Webster Leadbeater (eventually a close associate) and others, she became progressively convinced that the next impulse from the hierarchy would happen sooner than Blavatsky's timetable; these Theosophists came to believe it would involve the imminent reappearance of Maitreya as World Teacher, a monumental event in the Theosophical scheme of things. Besant had started commenting on the possible imminent arrival of the next emissary in 1896, several years before her assumption of the Society's presidency in 1907. By 1909, the "coming Teacher" was a main topic of her lectures and writings.

After Besant became President of the Society, the belief in Maitreya's imminent manifestation took on considerable weight. The subject was widely discussed and became a commonly held expectation among Theosophists. However, not all Theosophical Society members accepted Leadbeater's and Besant's ideas on the matter; the dissidents charged them with straying from Theosophical orthodoxy and, along with other concepts developed by the two, the writings on Maitreya were derisively labeled Neo-Theosophy by their opponents. The Adyar (Chennai)-based international leadership of the Society eventually overcame the protests, and by the late 1920s, the organization had stabilized, but in the meantime, additional World Teacher-related trouble was brewing.

==== World Teacher Project ====
In 1909 Leadbeater encountered fourteen-year-old Jiddu Krishnamurti (1895–1986) near the Theosophical Society headquarters at Adyar and came to believe the boy was a suitable candidate for the "vehicle" of the expected World Teacher. Soon after, he placed Krishnamurti under his and the Society's care. In late 1909 Besant, by then President of the Society and head of its Esoteric Section, admitted Krishnamurti into both; in March 1910 she became his legal guardian. Krishnamurti was subsequently groomed extensively for his expected role as the probable World Teacher, and a new organization, the Order of the Star in the East (OSE), was formed in 1911 to support him in this mission. The project received widespread publicity and enjoyed a worldwide following (mainly among Theosophists). It also faced opposition within and without the Theosophical Society, leading to years of upheaval, serious splits, and doctrinal schisms in Theosophy. The German Section, led by Rudolf Steiner, seceded from the Society and was eventually reorganized as the Anthroposophical Society. Additional negative repercussions occurred in 1929 when Krishnamurti repudiated the role the Theosophists expected him to fulfill, dissolved the Order of the Star, and completely disassociated himself from the World Teacher Project; soon after, he severed ties with the Society and Theosophy in general. These events reputedly prompted Leadbeater to declare, "the Coming [of Maitreya] has gone wrong", and damaged Theosophical organizations and the overall standing of Theosophy.

== Later concepts of Maitreya ==
Following the Krishnamurti debacle, major Theosophical organizations and writers became increasingly muted, at least publicly, on the subject of the reappearance of Maitreya and the possible next impulse of the reputed spiritual hierarchy. However the concepts of World Teacher, of a hidden spiritual hierarchy, and of masters of occult wisdom continued to have supporters. Some were Theosophical Society members, but increasingly such beliefs were found among near-Theosophical and non-Theosophical New Age adherents.

=== Alice A. Bailey ===
A major proponent was Alice Bailey (1880–1949), who left the Theosophical Society in the 1920s to establish the quasi-Theosophical Arcane School. She expanded Leadbeater's work and his Christology, and referred to Maitreya as the "Cosmic Christ", stating his Second Coming would occur sometime after the year 2025.

=== Ascended Master Teachings ===
The Theosophical Maitreya holds a prominent position in the Ascended Master Teachings. These encompass original Theosophical literature as well as later additions and interpretations by various non-Theosophical commentators and groups – such as the I AM Activity and Elizabeth Clare Prophet (1939–2009).

=== Benjamin Creme and Share International ===
Benjamin Creme (1922–2016) founder of Share International, a Maitreya-promoting organization, made a number of extraordinary statements and predictions based on reputed telepathic messages from Maitreya that failed to come true; as a result he had been considered a figure of amusement in the press.
