= A Treatise on White Magic =

1934 book by Alice Bailey

A Treatise on White Magic is a book by Alice Bailey. It is considered to be among the most important by students of her writings, as it is less abstract than most, and deals with many important subjects of her works in an introductory, even programmatic fashion. It was first published in 1934 with the subtitle 'The Way of the Disciple'. She promulgated White Magic as a discipline to serve humanity.

It is an esoteric text, which Bailey said was dictated telepathically by the Tibetan Master, Djwal Khul. It is offered as a "basic textbook" for the Western aspirant to initiation, and is divided into fifteen rules of magic, each one taking the reader further into the mysteries of spirituality.

Topics discussed include: how an aspirant can best prepare himself for service, the various ray types of their influences, the relationship between the macrocosm and microcosm, the spiritual, causal, astral and physical realms and their interactions, the spiritual psychology of man (although this is dealt with much more fully in the Esoteric Psychology volumes), The Hierarchy of Masters, esoteric groups and schools, the spiritual centres (or chakras), the occult concept of the Seven Rays, meditation work and much more. One of the main themes is that of soul control.

== Ultimate purpose of White Magic ==
Students of the works of Alice A. Bailey and Theosophy believe that the ultimate purpose of White Magic is furtherance of the spiritual and material evolution of humanity. Specifically, this evolution is conceived in terms of the increased benevolent manifestation of seven spiritual energies or Seven Rays. It is further believed that adept practitioners of White Magic, wielding the power of the Seven Rays, can contribute to this evolution.

The seven rays antific, philosophical, or practical. Students of these schools of thought think that the primary purpose of White Magic is the evolution of culture through the energy of Love-Wisdom (The second ray—the primary ray of which the other six rays are secondary expressions, because the second ray of Love-Wisdom is the ray of the Solar Logos, the governing deity of the Solar System.)

In the Theosophical Movement FAQ , Katinka Hesselink says of the founder of Theosophy [H. P. Blavatsky] that "She considered there to be two kinds of magic: black and white. White magic could only be performed by those pure of heart, mind and body - anything else was by definition black, because tinged with selfishness."
