= World Tai Chi and Qigong Day =

Annual event

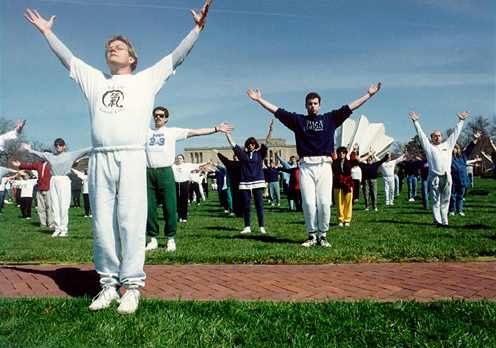
World Tai Chi & Qigong Day's first event in Kansas City, Missouri, US

World Tai Chi and Qigong Day (WTCQD), also spelled World T'ai Chi and Ch'i Kung Day, is an annual event held the last Saturday of April each year to promote the related disciplines of tai chi and Qigong in nearly eighty countries since 1999.

== Overview ==
The annual April event is open to the general public, and begins in the earliest time zones of Samoa at 10 am, and then participants across Oceania, Asia, Africa, Europe, North America, and South America take part, with celebrations in eighty nations and several hundred cities, ending with the final events in the last time zones of Hawaii almost an entire day later. Celebrations include mass tai chi and qigong exhibitions in many cities, and free classes in most participating cities.

World Tai Chi and Qigong Day's stated goals are to:

1. Educate the world about emerging medical research revealing health benefits that tai chi and qigong offer.
2. Educate about the increasing use of these ancient traditional Chinese medicine modalities in business, healthcare, education, penal and drug rehabilitation.
3. Provide a global vision of cooperation for health & healing purposes across geopolitical boundaries, and also an appeal to people worldwide to embrace wisdom from all the cultures of the world.
4. Thank Chinese culture for the gifts of tai chi and qigong to the world.

== Organization ==
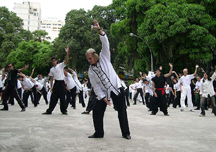
World Tai Chi & Qigong Day event in Rio de Janeiro, Brazil

The local events are independently organized by local tai chi and qigong schools, groups, and associations. The format of events varies by locality, although most involve free classes and mass exhibitions. International organizing for the event is done at the World Tai Chi and Qigong Day office in Overland Park, Kansas.

== History ==
The global event began in 1999. However the first event, that inspired the global event, was held in Kansas City, Missouri, in 1998 on the lawn of the Nelson Atkins Museum of Art in midtown Kansas City, where the Kansas City Tai Chi Club held a mass tai chi exhibition and teach-in involving nearly two-hundred people. CNN Headline News covered the event, which generated interest beyond Kansas City to quickly grow into a national and international event in the following years. World Tai Chi and Qigong Day has been officially proclaimed by governors of 25 US states, the senates of California, New York, and Puerto Rico, by Brazil's National Council of Deputies, and officials in several nations.

In 2013 Harvard Medical School launched a series of lectures regarding medical research on tai chi benefits. The Harvard lecture series homepage was titled "Celebrating World Tai Chi Day." The Harvard Medical School Guide to Tai Chi, released in 2012, cited World Tai Chi Day, writing, "A reflection of how successful the invasion of [tai chi] has been is World Tai Chi Day, organized by Bill Douglas. One of the purposes of this day is "to bring people across racial, economic, religious, and geo-political boundaries, to join together for the purpose of health and healing, providing an example to the world." Millions of people around the world—65 nations participated in 2011—gather one day each year to celebrate the health and healing benefits of tai chi and qigong." This global event was founded by Bill Douglas and Angela Wong Douglas, co-authors of The Complete Idiot's Guide to T'ai Chi and Qigong (Penguin Alpha Books, fourth edition, 2012). Their book's chapter entitled, "World T'ai Chi and Qigong Day," was a major force behind the global awareness of this health and healing event.

In 2013 the National Council of Deputies in Brazil joined 22 U.S. Governors, the Senates of California, New York, and Puerto Rico and other officials and bodies from around the world in recognizing World Tai Chi & Qigong Day. Local and national media worldwide have covered World Tai Chi & Qigong Day events, including Agence France Presse TV; Egyptian national television news; and New York City's Central Park event was covered by NDT Television News.

In 2019 Southampton City Council celebrated World Tai Chi & Qigong Day alongside UK Shaolin Temple, who jointly held a free public event in Southampton's Guildhall Square on Saturday 27 April 2019. The event highlighted the importance of mental health and wellbeing awareness with free tai chi and qigong taster sessions. Near to one hundred attendees sampled a number of simple exercise routines to incorporate into their daily routines. The message of the event also reached hundreds of thousands of people through social media and regional press coverage including the Southern Daily Echo Press and BBC Solent.

This global healing event, in turn, inspired what is now known as World Healing Day.

== See also ==
- Taoist meditation
- Taoist philosophy
- Taoist Tai Chi Society
- Traditional Chinese medicine
- International Day of Yoga
