= Edna Anne Wheeler Ballard =

American theosopher

- Born: Edna Anne Wheeler; June 25, 1886; Burlington, Iowa, United States
- Died: February 10, 1971 (aged 84); Chicago, Illinois, United States
- Other name: Lotus Ray King
- Occupation: Occultist
- Known for: Co-founding the Saint Germain Foundation; Leader of the I AM Movement

Edna Anne Wheeler Ballard, also known as Lotus Ray King (June 25, 1886 – February 10, 1971), was an American theosopher who co-founded the Saint Germain Foundation and served a co-leader of the I AM Movement with her husband Guy Ballard. In 1944, Ballard and her son Donald Ballard were charged with mail fraud and their court case would eventually be ruled by the US Supreme Court as United States v. Ballard where the charges were ultimately dismissed, on the basis of the court system incorrectly attempting to consider validity of their religious beliefs. Ballard's work with the I AM Movement is considered a predecessor to the current new age movement.

== Early life and education ==
Edna Anne Wheeler was born in 1886 in Burlington, Iowa. Her mother was Anna Hewitt Pearce and her father was Edward G. Wheeler, a railway clerk. Ballard became a concert harpist in 1912. In 1916, Ballard married Guy W. Ballard. Two years later in 1918, she had a child with Guy named Donald.

== I AM Movement ==
The couple resided in Chicago, Illinois. Ballard began working at the Philosopher's Nook, an occult bookstore. She also served as an editor of American Occultists. Guy was also interested in the occult, and while hiking at Mount Shasta in California in September 1931, he met an individual who claimed to be Saint Germain. Ballard called Saint Germain an "ascended master." Guy wrote back to Ballard, telling her about his interaction(s) with St. Germain. In 1931, the couple founded the Saint Germain Foundation and Saint Germain Press in Chicago. The called the umbrella over the two organizations the I AM Movement.

Ballard's role within the Movement was as an "accredited messenger of the ascended masters," alongside Guy. However, Ballard eventually took a step back as Guy led the organizations, serving as the primary messenger for St. Germain and other masters, including Jesus. The Ballards believed in past lives, with Elizabeth believing she was Elizabeth I and Joan of Arc in her past lives.

In 1939, Guy Ballard died and their son Donald became the leader of the I AM Movement. Prior to his father's death, Donald also served as a messenger per the wishes of St. Germain. However, both he and Elizabeth did not serve as primary messenger. Shortly thereafter, Elizabeth, Donald and other staff members were charged with mail fraud, with the charge being that the Movement was attempting to defraud mail recipients into joining a religion that was known to be false. Ballard was convicted twice, and the second time after a ruling was overturned. The case went to the US Supreme Court and was ruled as United States v. Ballard. Ballard, 322 U.S. 78 (1944) "Whether a religious belief is true or false is irrelevant to a judicial determination, as long as the belief is sincerely held." In other words, Ballard was found not guilty.

Ballard eventually began serving as a "messenger" for St. Germain and other masters in the fifties and in the sixties she hosted a radio show.

== Later life and legacy ==
Ballard died in February 1971 in Chicago. After her death, the Saint Germain Foundation and press were operated by the board of directors and select "appointed messengers". Additionally, no other movement members, including appointment messengers, have served as direct messengers of the masters, including St. Germain. During her role as messenger, Ballard left over 2,000 recordings of messages from St. Germain and the masters.
