= Quantum healing =

Type of alternative medicine

Alternative medicine
- Classification: Quantum mysticism
- Claims: Quantum phenomena are responsible for health and wellbeing
- Original proponents: Deepak Chopra

Quantum healing is a pseudoscientific mixture of ideas purportedly drawn from quantum mechanics, psychology, philosophy, and neurophysiology. Advocates of quantum healing assert that quantum phenomena govern health and wellbeing. There are different versions, which allude to various quantum ideas including wave particle duality and virtual particles, and more generally to "energy" and to vibrations. Quantum healing is a form of alternative medicine.

== History ==
Deepak Chopra coined the term "quantum healing" when he published the first edition of his book with that title in 1989. His discussions of quantum healing have been characterised as technobabble - "incoherent babbling strewn with scientific terms" which drives many of those who actually understand physics "crazy" and as "redefining Wrong".

Quantum healing has a number of vocal followers, but the scientific community widely regards it as nonsensical. The main criticism revolves around its systematic misinterpretation of modern physics, especially of the fact that macroscopic objects (such as the human body or individual cells) are much too large to exhibit inherently quantum properties like interference and wave function collapse.

Physicist and science communicator Brian Cox argues that misuse of the word "quantum", such as its use in the phrase quantum healing, has a negative effect on society as it undermines genuine science and discourages people from engaging with conventional medicine. He states that "for some scientists, the unfortunate distortion and misappropriation of scientific ideas that often accompanies their integration into popular culture is an unacceptable price to pay."

== See also ==
- List of esoteric healing articles
- Quantum mysticism
- Quantum mind
