= Djwal Khul =

Disciple in "The Ageless Wisdom" esoteric tradition

Djwal Khul (variously spelled 'Djwhal Khul', 'Djwal Kul', the 'Master D.K.', 'D.K.', or simply 'DK'), is believed by some Theosophists and others to be a Tibetan disciple in "The Ageless Wisdom" esoteric tradition. The texts describe him as a member of the 'Spiritual Hierarchy', or 'Brotherhood', of Mahatmas, one of the Masters of the Ancient Wisdom, defined as the spiritual guides of mankind and teachers of ancient cosmological, metaphysical, and esoteric principles that form the origin of all the world's great philosophies, mythologies and spiritual traditions. According to Theosophical writings, Djwal Khul is said to work on furthering the spiritual evolution of our planet through the teachings offered in the 24 books by Alice Bailey of Esoteric Teachings published by The Lucis Trust (then named the Lucifer Publishing Company); he is said to have telepathically transmitted the teachings to Bailey and is thus regarded by her followers as the communications director of the Masters of the Ancient Wisdom.

== In Theosophy and the writings of Alice Bailey ==
Djwal Khul's name first appeared in the work of Madame Blavatsky, a co-founder of the Theosophical Society and author of "The Secret Doctrine", published in 1888, which was primarily written by Koot Hoomi and Morya, according to Blavatsky and others in the Mahatma letters.

Bailey writes in August 1934, in the first person voice of DK: [I am] "a Tibetan disciple of a certain degree, and this tells you but little, for all are disciples from the humblest aspirant up to and beyond The Christ Himself. I live in a physical body like other men on the borders of Tibet and at times (from the esoteric standpoint) preside over a large group of Tibetan Lamas, when my other duties permit." In some writings, his name was omitted and he was referred to by the abbreviation "Master D. K." or the appellation "The Tibetan".

In 1919 Alice Bailey (1880–1949), severed her links with the Theosophical Society for various reasons and later began writing books she described as being telepathically dictated to her by Djwhal Khul whom she referred to as "The Tibetan" (later associated with the initials D.K.). According to Bailey, her D.K. was the main author behind Blavatsky's "The Secret Doctrine". Bailey stated that after initial resistance, she was eventually persuaded by the quality of what she had written in 'dictation' in the first few weeks work with DK to continue to write down the communications from this source. She wrote for 30 years, from 1919 to 1949.

Bailey wrote that Djwal Khul's intention was the revelation of esoteric teachings that were valuable for the continued training and teaching of spiritual aspirants in the 20th and early 21st century. She believed her work was done on behalf of the "spiritual hierarchy" of advanced beings, that included Djwal Khul, whose sole interest was to guide humanity towards the establishing of goodwill and right human relations, the vital first steps that would help prepare the way for the "Reappearance of the Christ" (called by Theosophists The Maitreya). Alice Bailey's 24 books with DK were to be the second in a series of three revelations, after Blavatsky's "The Secret Doctrine", that were meant present the preparatory teachings that would serve to usher in the New Age referred to as the Age of Aquarius, because the astrological sign of Aquarius will soon succeed this present Piscean cycle in the cycle of the astrological ages.

In a preface included in many of Bailey's books, Djwal Khul, in the dictations described by Bailey, refers to the fact that he has been reported to be an abbot of a Tibetan monastery and the spiritual preceptor of a large group of lamas. She wrote that he lived in Northern India, near the borders of Tibet. Other than that the books do not include personal details about Djwal Khul and the dictated content focuses on his esoteric teachings. Of the minimal personal details, Bailey writes that Djwhal Khul considers himself a disciple of a certain degree in the spiritual, non-physical, ashram of the Master Koot Hoomi, who is considered by Theosophists and other students of Alice Bailey's books to be another member of the same "spiritual hierarchy" of advanced beings.

C. W. Leadbeater claimed that he saw Djwal Khul teleport into a room in which he and Madame Blavatsky were sitting.

== In other New Age movements ==
Bailey's work and her books with Djwal Khul were published by the Lucis Trust, an organization she set up with her husband, Foster Bailey. Over time, Djwal Khul's name has appeared in the writings about Ascended Masters (a phrase not used by Bailey) of various New Age organizations such as the Ascended Master Teachings of Elizabeth Clare Prophet, who claims that she has channeled Djwal Khul as well as the other Mahatmas, such as Koot Hoomi and the Master El Morya, among many others, resulting in dozens of volumes of transcriptions. The leaders of these groups described themselves as having direct contact with him and other "Masters of Wisdom", and to be working as their disciples on the physical plane.

== Previous incarnation ==
According to Elizabeth Clare Prophet, one of Djwal Khul's previous incarnations was as Caspar, one of the Three Wise Men (the one who gave gold to Jesus).

== Criticism ==
The teachings of Djwal Khul, as conveyed through Bailey's many books in his name, discuss many controversial topics, such as nationalism, race relations, American isolationism, Soviet totalitarianism, fascism, Nazism, and Zionism. The books include content in line with the then current 19th century and early 20th century ideas and views about people of African descent, Aboriginal Australians, the Jewish people and Arabs, and of Judaism and orthodox Christianity and fundamentalist movements of both East and West, and her views have been criticized as such. Author Lee Penn has written that Bailey "expressed hatred for Judaism in many of her books." Russian historian Victor Shnirelman says "Racist and antisemitic trends are explicit ... in the occult teachings of Alice Bailey (founder of the New Age movement) and her followers, who wish to cleanse Christianity of its “Jewish inheritance” and reject the “Jewish Bible” as a prerequisite for entering the Age of Aquarius."

== Skeptical view ==
The scholar K. Paul Johnson maintains that the "Masters" that Madame Blavatsky wrote about and produced letters from were actually idealizations of people who were her mentors. Johnson asserts that the Djwal Khul was actually Dyal Singh Majithia, a member of the Singh Sabha, an Indian independence movement organization and Sikh reform movement.

== See also ==
- Alice Bailey
- Helena Petrovna Blavatsky
- Benjamin Creme
- Hodgson Report
- Lucis Trust
- Masters of Wisdom
- Reincarnation
- Helena Roerich
