= ThetaHealing =

Pseudoscientific system of alternative medicine and New Age beliefs

ThetaHealing (also Theta Healing) is the registered trademark for a method of meditation created by Vianna Stibal in 1995. ThetaHealing claims to change a practitioner's brain wave pattern to the theta pattern, allowing them to explore how "emotional energy" affects their health, and develop a "natural intuition".

The technique is administered by the ThetaHealing Institute of Knowledge (THInK), the organization founded by Stibal that develops training material and administers practitioner and instructor certification. According to THInK, ThetaHealing is taught by certified instructors in more than 150 countries.

ThetaHealing is an esoteric pseudoscience.

== Meditation process ==
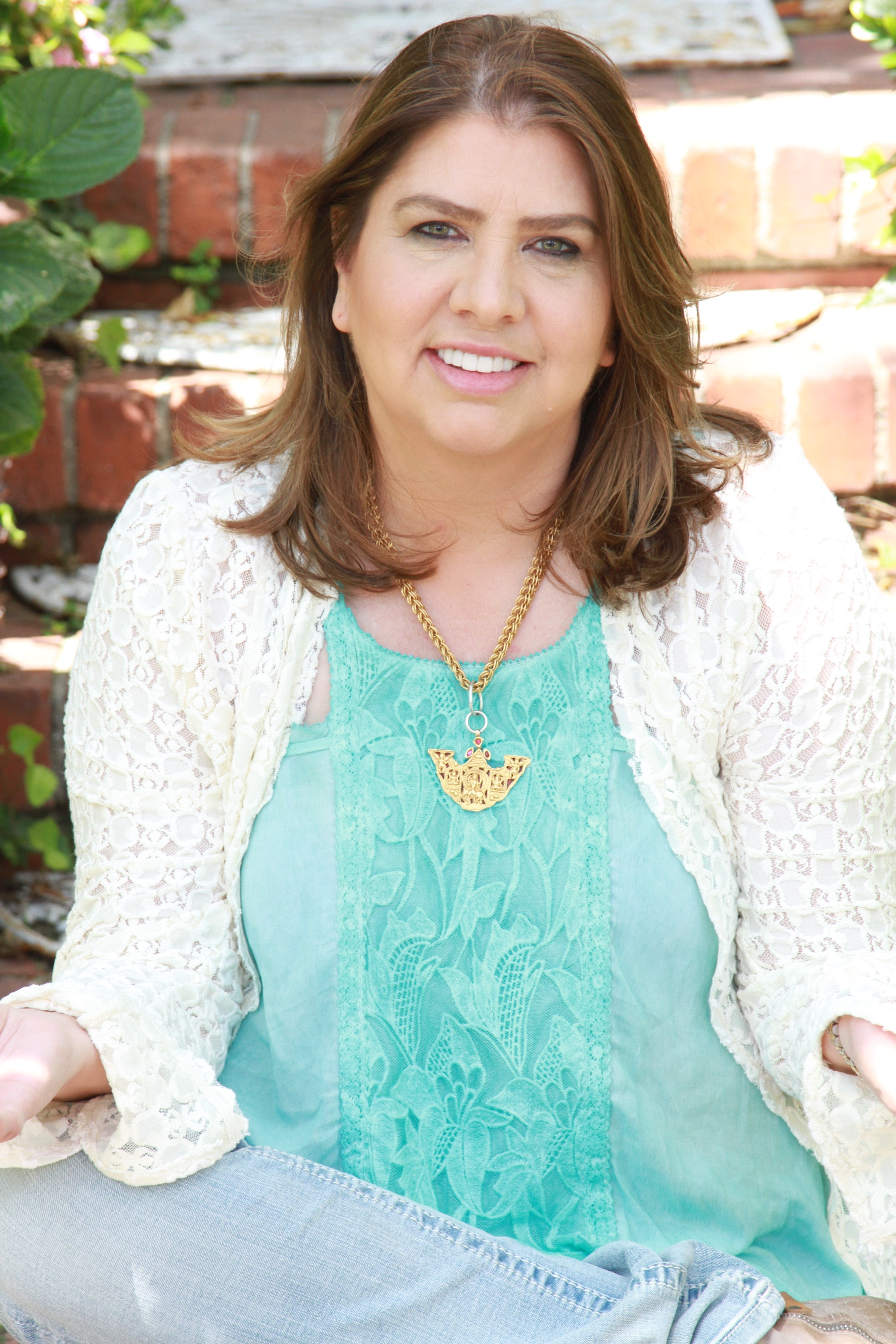
Vianna Stibal – creator of ThetaHealing

ThetaHealing is usually administered in the form of individual sessions in which the practitioner sits directly opposite the person, and initially attends to the person by listening and using probing questions. They may conduct a session long-distance through telephone or over the internet via video conferencing. The ThetaHealing technique is based on the idea that the beliefs in a person's conscious and unconscious mind directly impact their emotional well-being, which may impact their physical health.

=== Philosophy ===
ThetaHealing's philosophy is based on what Vianna Stibal, an American naturopath, calls "the seven planes of existence". According to her, these levels of existence build a framework to show the importance of the "Creator of all that is” (whose upper level is also described as the "Place of perfect love"). In addition, practitioners and instructors of the technique are open to everyone, regardless of the person's origin or religion.

The Theta Healing technique, according to founder Vianna Stibal, is always taught to be used in conjunction with evidence-based medicine.

== Criticism ==
The method has been criticized as "criminal" and "not supported by any kind of evidence" by scientific researcher Edzard Ernst. The McGill University Office for Science and Society pointed out that ThetaHealing did not increase theta wave activity, but that "It did the exact opposite. Theta activity overall went down".

ThetaHealing often employs the method of applied kinesiology, after putting patients into a deep meditation. The practice of applied kinesiology itself has been highly criticized and studies have shown that it lacks clinical value. ThetaHealing also has been widely criticized, notably by Jonathan Jarry at the Office for Science and Society, for being motivated by money rather than efficacy. For example, in order to enroll in a ThetaHealing course that teaches how "money is an illusion", one must pay $750.00. Other ThetaHealing courses include classes which teach how to "activate the 12 strands of DNA within each participant", despite the fact that this claim is not backed up by any scientific evidence. ThetaHealing course providers have also made false and unsubstantiated claims about cancer.

In 2014, Stibal and THInK were sued by former students Karra Alexander and Robby Robinson for fraud, breach of contract and punitive damages. A jury awarded Alexander $111,000 on her contract claim, $17,000 on the fraud claim, and $500,000 in punitive damages (reduced to $100,000 on appeal).

== See also ==
- New Thought
- List of esoteric healing articles
