= United States v. Ballard =

- Supreme Court of the United States

Argued March 3–6, 1944 Decided April 24, 1944
- Full case name: United States v. Ballard, et al.
- Citations: 322 U.S. 78 (more) 64 S. Ct. 882; 88 L. Ed. 1148; 1944 U.S. LEXIS 810

Case history
- Prior: 35 F. Supp. 105 (S.D. Cal. 1940); reversed, 138 F.2d 540 (9th Cir. 1943); cert. granted, 320 U.S. 733 (1944).

Holding
- "...[W]e do not agree that the truth or verity of respondents' religious doctrines or beliefs should have been submitted to the jury."

Court membership
- Chief Justice Harlan F. Stone Associate Justices Owen Roberts · Hugo Black; Stanley F. Reed · Felix Frankfurter; William O. Douglas · Frank Murphy; Robert H. Jackson · Wiley B. Rutledge

Case opinions
- Majority: Douglas, joined by Black, Reed, Murphy, Rutledge
- Dissent: Stone, joined by Roberts, Frankfurter
- Dissent: Jackson

Laws applied
- U.S. Const., Amends. I

United States v. Ballard, 322 U.S. 78 (1944), was a United States Supreme Court case in which the Court held that the First Amendment precludes courts from instructing juries to adjudicate the truth or falsity of religious beliefs.

The case arose from the appeal of the conviction of two leaders of the new religious "I AM" Activity movement for fraudulently seeking and collecting donations on the basis of religious claims that the defendants themselves allegedly did not believe.

The Supreme Court held that the question of whether the defendants' claims about their religious experiences were actually true should not have been submitted to a jury. The Court arrived at this conclusion in part because the "freedom of religious belief... embraces the right to maintain theories of life and of death and of the hereafter which are rank heresy to followers of the orthodox faiths." The Court did not address whether the sincerity of the defendants' beliefs was a proper question for the jury.

Justice Robert H. Jackson, dissenting, would have gone farther, suggesting that the entire case should be dismissed for coming too close to being an investigation into the truth of a religious conviction. He would have held unconstitutional a jury determination of whether the defendants' religious beliefs were sincere, as well as whether they were true.

== Prior history ==
After Guy Ballard's death, his wife, Edna Anne Wheeler Ballard, and son, Donald Ballard, were indicted for 18 counts of fraud. The indictment charged that the Ballards fraudulently collected over $3 million from their followers on the basis of religious claims the Ballards knew were false. Their followers protested outside the courthouse.

The District Court instructed the jury to convict if they found that the Ballards did not have a good faith belief in their religious claims. The Ballards argued that the question of their good faith belief should not be submitted to the jury, but that if it was the Court should also instruct the jury to determine whether the religious beliefs they espoused were true. The jury convicted the Ballards.

The United States Court of Appeals for the Ninth Circuit overturned the conviction and granted a new trial, declaring that the District Court erred in restricting the issue to whether the defendants had a good faith belief in their claims, and should also have instructed the jury to decide whether the beliefs the defendants espoused were in fact true. The government appealed to the Supreme Court.

== Decision ==
=== Majority opinion ===
- Written by: William O. Douglas; joined by: Black, Reed, Murphy, Rutledge

The majority opinion reversed the decision of the Court of Appeals and remanded the case to that court, ruling that the trial court had rightly withheld the question of the truth or falsity of the beliefs from the jury. There was no ruling on the propriety of the jury instructions regarding the sincerity of the defendants' beliefs. In his majority opinion, Justice Douglas wrote:

The religious views espoused by respondents might seem incredible, if not preposterous, to most people. But if those doctrines are subject to trial before a jury charged with finding their truth or falsity, then the same can be done with the religious beliefs of any sect. When the triers of fact undertake that task, they enter a forbidden domain. The First Amendment does not select any one group or any one type of religion for preferred treatment. It puts them all in that position.

Having concluded that the Court of Appeals' rationale for overturning the convictions was incorrect, the Court remanded the case for the Court of Appeals to further consider other grounds on which the Ballards had challenged the convictions.

=== Chief Justice Stone's dissent ===
- Written by: Stone; joined by: Roberts, Frankfurter

Chief Justice Stone, dissenting, argued that the question of truthfulness was appropriate for the jury:

I am not prepared to say that the constitutional guarantee of freedom of religion affords immunity from criminal prosecution for the fraudulent procurement of money by false statements as to one's religious experiences, more than it renders polygamy or libel immune from criminal prosecution... I cannot say that freedom of thought and worship includes freedom to procure money by making knowingly false statements about one's religious experiences.

=== Justice Jackson's dissent ===
Justice Jackson dissented because he believed that the First Amendment foreclosed inquiry into both the truthfulness of the defendants' religious claims and their sincerity. He would have dismissed the case entirely for being too close to a religious persecution:

I should say the defendants have done just that for which they are indicted. If I might agree to their conviction without creating a precedent, I cheerfully would do so. I can see in their teachings nothing but humbug, untainted by any trace of truth. But that does not dispose of the constitutional question whether misrepresentation of religious experience or belief is prosecutable; it rather emphasizes the danger of such prosecutions.

Prosecutions of this character easily could degenerate into religious persecution. I would dismiss the indictment and have done with this business of judicially examining other people's faiths.

All schools of religious thought make enormous assumptions, generally on the basis of revelations authenticated by some sign or miracle.

Some who profess belief in the Bible read literally what others read as allegory or metaphor, as they read Aesop's fables.

If we try religious sincerity severed from religious verity, we isolate the dispute from the very considerations which, in common experience, provide its most reliable answer.

William James, who wrote on these matters as a scientist, reminds us that it is not theology and ceremonies which keep religion going. Its vitality is in the religious experiences of many people. "If you ask what these experiences are, they are conversations with the unseen, voices and visions, responses to prayer, changes of heart, deliverances from fear, inflowings of help, assurances of support, whenever certain persons set their own internal attitude in certain appropriate ways."

If religious liberty includes, as it must, the right to communicate such experiences to others, it seems to me an impossible task for juries to separate fancied ones from real ones, dreams from happenings, and hallucinations from true clairvoyance. Such experiences, like some tones and colors, have existence for one, but none at all for another. They cannot be verified to the minds of those whose field of consciousness does not include religious insight. When one comes to trial which turns on any aspect of religious belief or representation, unbelievers among his judges are likely not to understand, and are almost certain not to believe, him.

== Subsequent history ==
On remand to the United States Court of Appeals for the Ninth Circuit, the Court of Appeals affirmed the original conviction without rehearing. The defendants once again petitioned for a writ of certiorari and it was once again granted, this time on the issue of women being excluded from grand jury and the trial jury. The Supreme Court ruled in favor of the defendants and dismissed the indictment as well as the subsequent conviction.
