= Lucis Trust =

Nonprofit in the US

Logo of the Lucis Trust

The Lucis Trust, formerly known as the Lucifer Publishing Company, is a nonprofit service organization incorporated in the United States in 1922 by Alice Bailey and her husband Foster Bailey, to act as a fiduciary trust for the publishing of twenty-four books of esoteric, occult philosophy published under Alice Bailey's name, and to fund and administer activities concerned with the establishment of "right human relations". These include the Arcane School, a school for esoteric training, World Goodwill, Triangles, a lending library, The Beacon magazine, as well as the publishing company.

The objectives of the Lucis Trust as stated in its charter are: "To encourage the study of comparative religion, philosophy, science and art; to encourage every line of thought tending to the broadening of human sympathies and interests, and the expansion of ethical religious and educational literature; to assist or to engage in activities for the relief of suffering and for human betterment; and, in general, to further worthy efforts for humanitarian and educational ends."

The Lucis Trust's publishing company was founded in the early 1920s as the Lucifer Publishing Company. The name has been attributed to the Baileys' study of theosophical teachings that Lucifer the archangel brought intelligence to mankind. The name was changed in 1925 to the Lucis Publishing Company. It has headquarters in New York City, London, and Geneva.

The Trust is established in Great Britain under the title "Lucis Trust Ltd.", in Switzerland as "Lucis Trust Association", and in the Netherlands as the "Lucis Trust Stichting".

The Lucis Trust runs a blog, "World Goodwill", which focuses on defining new Sustainable Development Goals for humanity.

== See also ==
- Helena Blavatsky
- Benjamin Creme
- Djwal Khul
- Helena Roerich
- Theosophy
