= Josephine Ransom =

Australian Theosophist and writer

Josephine Maria Ransom, née Davies (1879–1960) was an Australian Theosophist and writer. She served as General Secretary of three different national sections of the Theosophical Society, and wrote A Short History of the Theosophical Society. Ransom was also Honorary Secretary of the Britain and India Association, and editor of its magazine Britain and India.

== Life ==
Josephine Davies was born in Armidale, Australia on 22 March 1879. She travelled to India, where she became a member of the Theosophical Society in 1897, and worked with Annie Besant in Ceylon (today Sri Lanka).

After moving to England, she attempted to make the English more aware of Indian attitudes. In 1918 she lectured English audiences advocating Indian self-government. After the Jallianwala Bagh massacre she founded an illustrated monthly magazine, Britain and India, 'for the Promotion of Friendliness, Understanding and Sympathy between Britain and India'. Charlotte Despard, persuaded by Annie Besant that "womenhood everywhere is one", contributed an address to Indian women in support of the franchise for Indian women. Sarojini Naidu, then living in London, also wrote for the journal, and it featured interviews with other intellectuals such as Rabindranath Tagore. By August 1920 the magazine needed to become bimonthly, and financial difficulties forced its closure at the end of the year.

Ransom also regularly lectured on different aspects of Theosophy, and was active in the organization of the Theosophical Society. She was General Secretary of the Australian Section of the Theosophical Society in 1924–5, and General Secretary of the South African Section in 1926–7. She was General Secretary of the English Section between 1933 and 1936. .

Though Ransom was nominated Vice-President of the Theosophical Society in 1960, she never assumed office. After a traffic accident in London, she died on 2 December 1960.

== Works ==
- Schools of To-morrow in England. London: G. Bell and Sons, 1919.
- Indian Tales of Love and Beauty. Adyar, Madras, India: Theosophist Office, 1912. With a foreword by Annie Besant.
- Irish Tales of Love and Beauty. London : Arthur H. Stockwell, 1924.
- Madame Blavatsky as Occultist. London: Theosophical Publishing House, 1931.
- Studies in the Secret Doctrine. Wheaton, Ill., The Theosophical Press, 1934.
- The Seventy-Fifth Anniversary Book of the Theosophical Society: a short history of the society's growth from 1926-1950. Adyar, India: Theosophical Publishing House, 1950.
- A Short History of the Theosophical Society. Adyar, India: Theosophical Publishing House, 1938. With a preface by G. S. Arundale.
