= Root race =

Pseudoscientific concept in Theosophy

Root races are concepts in the esoteric cosmology of Theosophy. As described in Helena Petrovna Blavatsky's book The Secret Doctrine (1888), these races correspond to stages of human evolution and existed mainly on now-lost continents. Blavatsky's model was developed by later theosophists, most notably William Scott-Elliot in The Story of Atlantis (1896) and The Lost Lemuria (1904). Annie Besant further developed the model in Man: Whence, How and Whither (1913). Both Besant and Scott-Elliot relied on information from Charles Webster Leadbeater obtained by "astral clairvoyance". Further elaboration was provided by Rudolf Steiner in Atlantis and Lemuria (1904). Rudolf Steiner, and subsequent theosophist authors, have called the time periods associated with these races Epochs (Steiner felt that the term "race" was not adequate anymore for modern humanity).

== Sources ==
According to historian James Webb, the occult concept of succeeding prehistoric races, as later adopted by Blavatsky, was first introduced by the French author Antoine Fabre d'Olivet in his Histoire philosophique du genre humain (1824). Also prior to Blavatsky, the root races were described by the English theosophist Alfred Percy Sinnett in Esoteric Buddhism (1883).

== Locations of the proposed former continents ==
Some theosophical writers, attempting to reconcile current geological science with some earlier theosophical teachings, have equated Lemuria with the former supercontinent of Gondwana. An opposing view subscribes to the theories of Eduard Suess, who argued that Gondwanaland consisted of parts of the present continents in their present positions, but joined to one another by other lands that have since been submerged. This is also the position of Master Samael Aun Weor.

Atlantis, in the Theosophical cosmology, was a continent that covered a significant part of what is now the Atlantic Ocean. The large continent of Atlantis is said to have "first divided, and then broken later on into seven peninsulas and islands". When the main part of Atlantis began to sink, Atlantean settlers migrated to the new lands which were rising to the east, west, and south. These new lands became the Americas, Africa, parts of Asia, and the present European countries, stretching from the Ural Mountains of Russia, westward to include the islands of Ireland and Great Britain, and even farther westward than that in former times. Some emigrants from the remaining islands in the Atlantic settled on new islands to the east which later consolidated into what is now the district of the Abyssinian highlands and lands somewhat to the north. Atlantis perished through flooding and submergence in 9,564 BC, and its destruction is explained by claiming successive disturbances in the axial rotation of Earth which caused earthquakes, which led to the sudden sinking of Atlantis.

== Root races, epochs and sub-races ==
According to Blavatsky's writings, there are seven root races assembling for our Earth; each root race is divided into seven subraces. Only five root races have appeared so far; the sixth is expected to emerge in the 28th century. Francis Bacon (whom theosophy considers to be the legendary Count of St. Germain) in his work The New Atlantis (1627) describes a potential future civilization which lives on a land called Bensalem.

=== The first root race (Polarian) ===
The first root race was "ethereal", i.e. they were composed of etheric matter. They reproduced by dividing like an amoeba. Earth was still cooling at that time. The first mountain to arise out of the stormy primeval ocean was Mount Meru.

=== The second root race (Hyperborean) ===
The second root race lived in Hyperborea. The second root race was colored golden yellow. Hyperborea included what is now Northern Canada, Greenland, Iceland, Scandinavia, Northern Russia and Kamchatka. The climate was tropical because Earth had not yet developed an axial tilt. The esoteric name of their continent is Plaksha; they called themselves the Kimpurshas. They reproduced by budding.

=== The third root race (Lemurian) ===
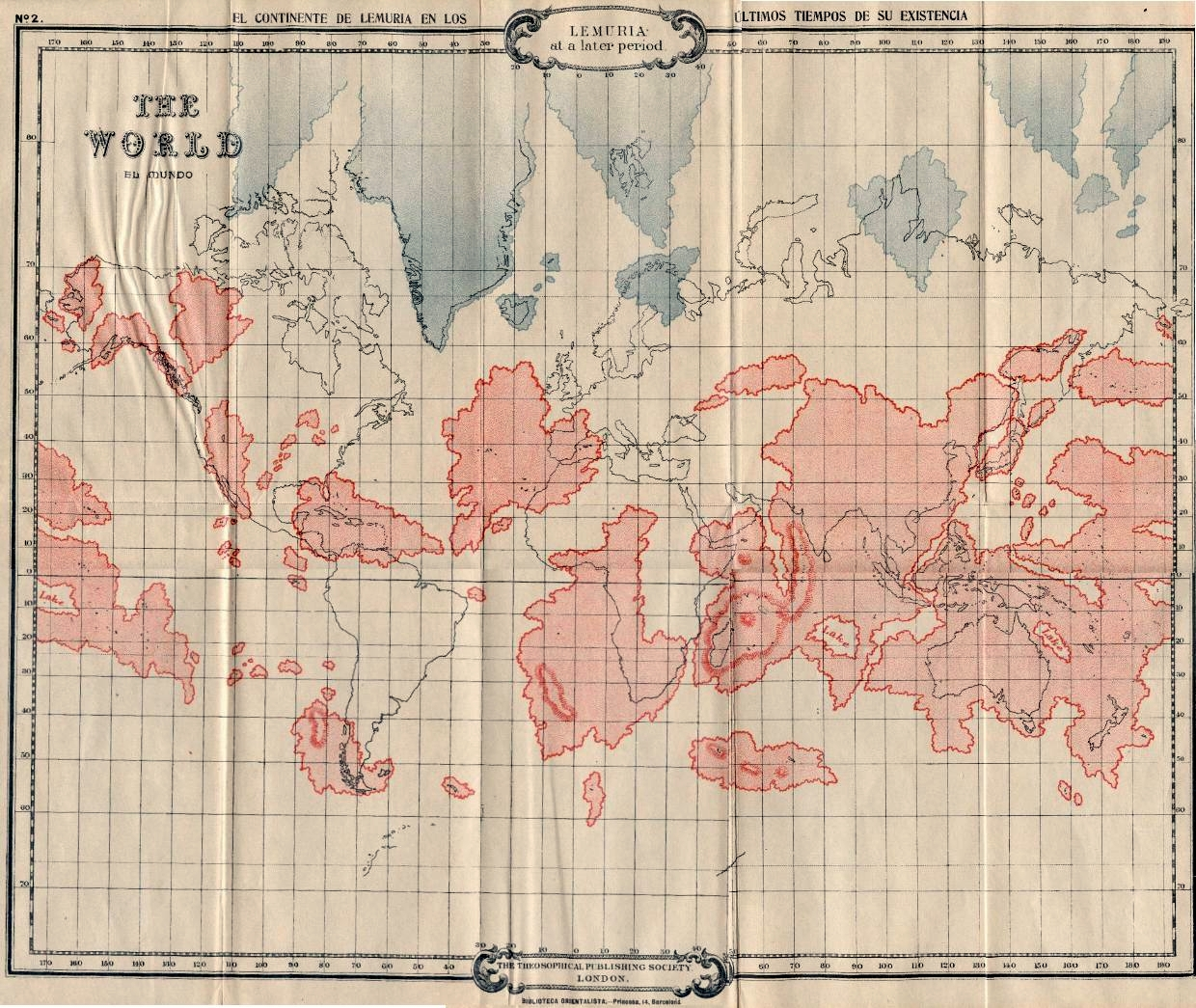
Map of Lemuria superimposed over the modern continents from William Scott-Elliot, The Story of Atlantis and Lost Lemuria.

The third root race, the Lemurian lived in Lemuria. The esoteric name of Lemuria is Shalmali. Lemuria, according to Theosophists, existed in a large part of what is now the Indian Ocean including Australia and extending into the South Pacific Ocean; its last remnants are the Australian continent, the island of New Guinea, and the island of Madagascar. Lemuria sank gradually and was eventually destroyed by incessantly erupting volcanoes. In the late 19th and early 20th centuries, it was thought by geologists that the age of the Earth was only about 200 million years (because radioactive dating had not yet come into use), so the geological epochs were believed to have occurred at a much later time than is thought to be the case today. According to traditional Theosophy, the Lemurian root race began 34½ million years ago, in the middle of what was then believed to be the Jurassic; thus, the people of Lemuria coexisted with the dinosaurs. The Lemurian race was much taller and bigger than our current race. The first three subraces of the Lemurians reproduced by laying eggs, but the fourth subrace, beginning 16½ million years ago, began to reproduce like modern humans. As Lemuria was slowly submerged due to volcanic eruptions, the Lemurians colonized the areas surrounding Lemuria, namely Africa, Southern India and the East Indies. The descendants of the Lemurian root race, according to traditional Theosophy, include the Capoid race, the Congoid race, the Dravidians, and the Australoid race.

=== The fourth root race (Atlantean) ===
This race inhabited Atlantis.

==== Subraces of the Atlantean root race ====
The fourth root race, the Atlantean, according to Theosophy arose approximately 4,500,000 years ago in Africa from the fourth subrace of the Lemurians in a part of Africa that had been colonized by that subrace in the area now inhabited by the Ashanti. According to Theosophists the first Atlantean subrace was the result of the last, or seventh Lemurian subrace, Chankshusha Manu, which migrated first to the south of the Atlantean continent and, from there, migrated further north. The esoteric name of Atlantis is Kusha. The Atlantean root race had Mongolian features; they began with bronze skin and gradually evolved into the red American Indian, brown Malayan, and yellow Mongolian races, because some Atlanteans eventually migrated to the Americas and Asia. The seven subraces of the Atlantean root race were

1. the Rmoahal
2. the Tlavati (Cro-Magnons)
3. the Toltec (a term which Theosophists use as a synonym for the Atlantean ancestors of the American Indians)
4. the Turanian
5. the original Semites (i.e. Phoenicians)
6. the Akkadians, and
7. the Mongolian, which migrated to and colonized Central Asia, East Asia, and Southeast Asia.

The descendants of the Atlanteans according to traditional Theosophy include those of the Mongolian race, the Malayan race, and the American Indian race as well as some people of what in the late 19th and early 20th centuries was called the "olive-skinned" Mediterranean race.

==== The civilization of Atlantis ====
According to Powell, the long period of time when Atlantis was ruled by the Toltecs (the ancestors of the Native Americans), the civilization of Atlantis was at its height. This was the period between about 1,000,000 and 900,000 years ago, called the Golden Age of Atlantis. The Atlanteans had many luxuries and conveniences. Their capital city was called The City of the Golden Gates. At its height, it had two million inhabitants. There were extensive aqueducts leading to the city from a mountain lake. The Atlanteans had airships that could seat two to eight people. The economic system was socialist like that of the Incas. Atlanteans were the first to develop organized warfare. The military deployed air battleships that contained 50 to 100 fighting men. These air battleships deployed poison gas bombs. The infantry fired fire-tipped arrows. The Toltecs on Atlantis worshipped the Sun in temples as grand as those of ancient Egypt that were decorated in bright colors. The sacred word used in meditation was Tau (this was the equivalent of the Aryan sacred word AUM). As noted above, the Toltecs colonized all of North America and South America and thus became the people we know as the Amerindians. The downfall of Atlantis started when some of the Toltecs began to practice black magic about 850,000 BC, corrupted by the dragon "Thevetat", remembered as Devadatta, the opponent of Buddha. The people began to become selfish and materialistic. Soon thereafter, the Turanians (the ancestors of the people we now know as the Turkic peoples) became dominant in much of Atlantis. The Turanians continued the practice of black magic which reached its height about 250,000 BC and continued until the final sinking of Atlantis, although they were opposed by white magicians. The Master Morya incarnated as the Emperor of Atlantis in 220,000 BC to oppose the black magicians. The black magicians used magical spells to breed human-animal chimeras. They possessed an army composed of chimeras that were composites composed of a human body with the heads of fierce predators such as lions, tigers and bears, that ate enemy corpses on the battlefield. The war between the white magicians and the black magicians continued until the end of Atlantis. The Masters of the Ancient Wisdom telepathically warned their disciples (the white magicians) to flee Atlantis in ships while there was still time to get out before the final cataclysm. As noted above, the final sudden submergence of Atlantis due to earthquakes occurred in 9,564 BC .

=== The fifth root race (Aryan) ===
==== Early beginnings of the Aryan root race ====
Blavatsky asserted humanity is now in the fifth or Aryan root race, which Theosophists believe to have emerged from the previous fourth root race (Atlantean root race) beginning about 100,000 years ago in Atlantis. (According to Powell, when Madame Blavatsky stated the Aryan root race was 1,000,000 years old, she meant that the souls of the people that later physically incarnated as the first Aryans about 100,000 years ago began to incarnate in the bodies of Atlanteans 1,000,000 years ago. However, another way of interpreting this is that Nature began to create the Aryan race before the final cataclysms.) Theosophists believe the Aryan root race was physically progenerated by the Vaivasvatu Manu, one of the Masters of the Ancient Wisdom (compare and contrast with Vaivasvata Manu of Hinduism). The present-day ethnic group most closely related to the new race is the Kabyle. The small band of only 9,000 people constituting the then small Aryan root race migrated out of Atlantis in 79,797 BC. The bards of the new white root-race poetically referred to the new race as being moon-colored. A small group of these Aryan migrants from Atlantis split from the main body of migrants and went south to the shore of an inland sea in what was then a verdant and lush Sahara where they founded the "City of the Sun". The main body of migrants continued onwards to an island called the "white island" in the middle of what was then an inland sea in what is now the Gobi desert, where they established the "City of the Bridge". (The "City of the Bridge" was constructed directly below the etheric city called Shamballa where Theosophists believe the governing deity of Earth, Sanat Kumara (compare and contrast with Sanatkumaras of Hinduism), dwells; thus, the ongoing evolution of the Aryan root race has been divinely guided by the being Theosophists call "The Lord of the World".)

The esoteric name of the whole of the present land surface of Earth, i.e. the World Island, the Americas, the Australian continent and Antarctica taken as a whole is Krauncha.

Blavatsky connects physical race with spiritual attributes constantly throughout her works:

The intellectual difference between the Aryan and other civilized nations and such savages as the South Sea Islanders, is inexplicable on any other grounds. No amount of culture, nor generations of training amid civilization, could raise such human specimens as the Bushmen, the Veddhas of Ceylon, and some African tribes, to the same intellectual level as the Aryans, the Semites, and the Turanians so called. The 'sacred spark' is missing in them and it is they who are the only inferior races on the globe, now happily – owing to the wise adjustment of nature which ever works in that direction – fast dying out. Verily mankind is 'of one blood,' but not of the same essence. We are the hot-house, artificially quickened plants in nature, having in us a spark, which in them is latent." ... Esoteric history teaches that idols and their worship died out with the Fourth Race, until the survivors of the hybrid races of the latter (Chinamen, African Negroes, &c.) gradually brought the worship back. The Vedas countenance no idols; all the modern Hindu writings do.

Generally speaking, a large percentage of the people who live in the time of the period of the fifth root race are part of the fifth root race. However Blavatsky also opines that some Semitic peoples have become "degenerate in spirituality". She asserted that some peoples descended from the Lemurians are "semi-animal creatures". These latter include "the Tasmanians, a portion of the Australians." There are also "considerable numbers of the mixed Lemuro-Atlantean peoples produced by various crossings with such semi-human stocks -- e.g., the wild men of Borneo, the Veddhas of Ceylon, most of the remaining Australians, Bushmen, Negritos, Andaman Islanders, etc." All these aforementioned groups mentioned by Blavatsky, except the Borneians, are part of what in the late 19th and most of the 20th century was called the Australoid race (except for the Bushmen, part of the Capoid race), both of which races, as noted above, were believed by traditional Theosophists to have been descended from the Lemurians.

==== Subraces of the Aryan root race ====
Blavatsky described the fifth root race with the following words:

The Aryan races, for instance, now varying from dark brown, almost black, red-brown-yellow, down to the whitest creamy colour, are yet all of one and the same stock – the Fifth Root-Race – and spring from one single progenitor, ... who is said to have lived over 18,000,000 years ago, and also 850,000 years ago – at the time of the sinking of the last remnants of the great continent of Atlantis.

She also prophesies of the destruction of the racial "failures of nature" as the future "higher race" ascends:

Thus will mankind, race after race, perform its appointed cycle-pilgrimage. Climates will, and have already begun, to change, each tropical year after the other dropping one sub-race, but only to beget another higher race on the ascending cycle; while a series of other less favoured groups – the failures of nature – will, like some individual men, vanish from the human family without even leaving a trace behind.

The subraces (which Steiner renamed "Cultural Epochs" as a more adequate expression for our times) of the Aryan Fifth Root Race include the first subrace, the Hindu, which migrated from the "City of the Bridge" on the white island in the middle of the Gobi inland sea to India in 60,000 BC; the second subrace, the Arabian, which migrated from the "City of the Bridge" to Arabia in 40,000 BC; the third subrace, the Persian, which migrated from the "City of the Bridge" to Persia in 30,000 BC; the fourth subrace, the Celts, which migrated from the "City of the Bridge" to Western Europe beginning in 20,000 BC (the Mycenaean Greeks are regarded as an offshoot of the Celtic subrace that colonized Southeast Europe); and the fifth subrace, the Teutonic, which also migrated from the "City of the Bridge" to what is now Germany beginning in 20,000 BC (the Slavs are regarded as an offshoot of the Teutonic subrace that colonized Russia and surrounding areas).

==== The emergence of the sixth subrace of the Aryan root race ====
According to Blavatsky the sixth subrace of the Aryan root race will begin to evolve in the area of the United States in the early 21st century. This sixth subrace of the Aryan root race will be called the Australo-American subrace and is believed by Theosophists to be now arising from the Teutonic subrace of the Aryan root race in Australia and in the Western United States (many individuals of the new subrace will be born in California) and its surrounding nearby areas (i.e., the Australo-American subrace is in arising from the Anglo-American, Anglo-Canadian, Anglo-Australian and presumably also the Anglo-New Zealander ethnic groups). The sixth or Australo-American sub-race will "possess certain psychic powers, and for this the pituitary body will be developed, thus giving an additional sense, that of cognising astral emotions in the ordinary waking consciousness. We may say that in general the sixth sub-race will bring in wisdom and intuition, blending all that is best in the intelligence of the fifth subrace and the emotion of the fourth."

=== The sixth root race ===
According to C. W. Leadbeater, a colony will be established in Baja California by the Theosophical Society under the guidance of the Masters of the Ancient Wisdom in the 28th century for the intensive selective eugenic breeding of the sixth root race. The Master Morya will physically incarnate in order to be the Manu ("progenitor") of this new root race. By that time, the world will be powered by nuclear power and there will be a single world government led by a person who will be the reincarnation of Julius Caesar. Tens of thousands of years in the future, a new continent will arise in the Pacific Ocean that will be the future home of the sixth root race. California west of the San Andreas Fault will break off from the mainland of North America and become the Island of California off the eastern coast of the new continent.

Victor Skumin elaborated on the theosophical conceptions of spiritual evolution and proposed (1990) a classification of Homo spiritalis (Latin: spiritual man), the sixth root race, consisting of eight subraces: HS0 Anabiosis spiritalis, HS1 Scientella spiritalis, HS2 Aurora spiritalis, HS3 Ascensus spiritalis, HS4 Vocatus spiritalis, HS5 Illuminatio spiritalis, НS6 Creatio spiritalis, and HS7 Servitus spiritalis. According to Skumin:

- Anabiosis spiritalis is spirituality in the potential of unmanifest accumulations of personality, the charge of the fires of spiritual creation;
- Scientella spiritalis is the cordial presentiment of the presence and demands of the spirit, spiritualization of the fire of centers, glimpses of self-consciousness of a spiritual person;
- Aurora spiritalis is the imperative of the spirit, the action of the spiritual fire of the centers in the heart, the kindling of the fire of the spirit, the formation of the orientation of the personality to the spiritual improvement of life;
- Ascensus spiritalis is the dawn of spiritual aspirations, the action of the fire of the spirit in the heart, searching spiritual work, aspiration of self-consciousness to merge with the One Spirit;
- Vocatus spiritalis is the maturation of spiritual accumulations, the purposeful spiritual creation, self-awareness and realization of a person as a warrior of the spirit;
- IIluminatio spiritalis is the beginning of the fiery transmutation, the lighting of the achievement fire; revealing the identity of man - the earthly carrier of the Thoughts of the One Spirit;
- Creatio Spiritalis is the beginning of fiery creation, the action of the fire of achievement in the heart, the revealing self-consciousness of man as the earthly carrier of the Light of the One Spirit;
- Servitus Spiritalis is the carrying a consciously accepted duty-commission, the synthesis of spirituality in the clarity of knowledge of a fiery man.

=== The seventh root race ===
The seventh root race will arise from the seventh subrace of the sixth root race on the future continent that the sixth root race will be living on that will arise from the Pacific Ocean. The continent they will inhabit is esoterically called Pushkara.

This root race will be the last race to appear on planet Earth. Theosophist Scott Ramsey predicts that any sexual difference among humans will cease to exist, and both conception and birth will become entirely spiritual.

He also writes humanity will have a great spiritual development, and he describes this development in the following words:

"Everything that is irredeemably sinful and wicked, cruel and destructive, will have been eliminated, and that which is found to survive will be swept away from being, owing, so to speak, to a Karmic tidal-wave in the shape of scavenger-plagues, geological convulsions and other means of destruction."

== Migration to Mercury ==
It is believed by some Neo-Theosophists that after the present round of human spiritual evolution by reincarnation of souls in root races is completed several dozen million years from now, the human race will migrate to the planet Mercury to continue its spiritual and physical evolution.

Some also believe that the human race lived on Mars before the current round of spiritual evolution, and migrated to Earth after the previous round ended. According to astrologer Walter D. Pullen, every round of spiritual evolution takes place within a chain of similar rounds, and these chains are located in a group called a scheme. He also states that seven rounds make a chain, and seven chains make a scheme. Some Neo-Theosophists believe that the human race is currently in the fourth chain in a scheme. In addition, it is believed by some that life on Mercury will be “less material” than on Earth, and the average level of consciousness will extend for longer, as humanity will possess etheric vision.

== See also ==
- Agni Yoga
- Neo-Theosophy
- Theosophy (Blavatskian)

== Literature ==
- Annie Besant, C.W. Leadbeater, Man: How, Whence, and Whither. Adyar, India: Theosophical Publishing House (1913).
- Helena Blavatsky, The Secret Doctrine.
- Arthur E. Powell, The Solar System: A Complete Outline of the Theosophical Scheme of Evolution. London: The Theosophical Publishing House (1930).
- Sune Nordwall, On allegations of anti-Semitism and racism in anthroposophy,
- Трефилов, Владимир (1994). "Глава xvii: Надконфессиональная синкретическая религиозная философия" [Chapter xvii: Non-denominational syncretic religious philosophy]. In Яблоков, Игорь (ed.). Основы религиоведения. Учебник [Fundamentals of Religious Studies. Textbook] (in Russian). Москва: Высшая школа. pp. 233–245. ISBN 5-06-002849-6.
