= World Healing Day =

World Healing Day is a name used for a variety of events that have been held in hundreds of cities in over 65 nations. World Healing Day events have included yoga, prayer, tai chi, qigong, Reiki, faith healing, Meditation Day, Native Aboriginal Sacred Dance Day, Sufi Dance, Art and Music Healing.

== History ==
The template for World Healing Day events grew from the example of World Tai Chi & Qigong Day (WTCQD) events which had been held for over a decade worldwide. WTCQD's events had been officially proclaimed by governors, senates, mayors, legislatures in most US States and in several countries.

The WTCQD's official motto "One World ... One Breath", then became the official motto of World Healing Day as well.
