= "I AM" Activity =

Ascended master teachings religious movement

- Type: New Religious Movement
- Classification: Neo-Theosophy
- Founder: Guy Ballard and Edna Ballard
- Origin: 1930s Chicago, Illinois, United States

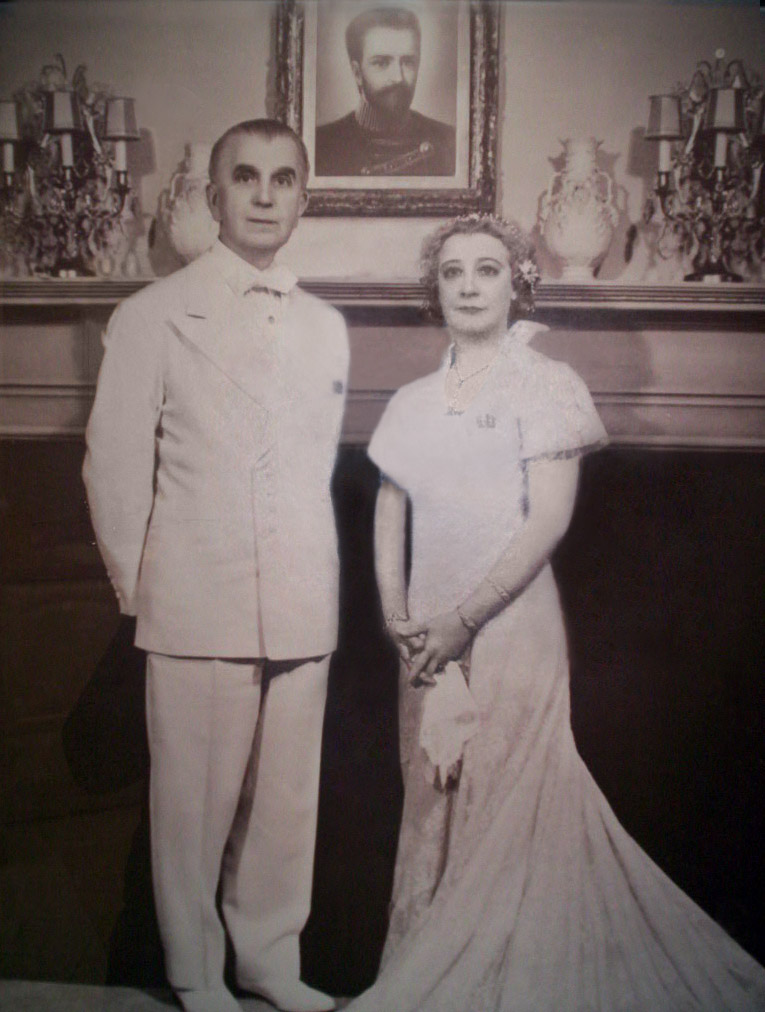
Guy and Edna Ballard

The I AM Activity, also referred to as the I AM Temple, is a neo-Theosophical religious movement founded in the early 1930s by Guy Ballard (1878–1939) and his wife Edna Anne Wheeler Ballard (1886–1971) in Chicago, Illinois, based on the purported teachings of "ascended masters." It is an offshoot of theosophy and a major precursor of several New Age religions including the Church Universal and Triumphant.

The movement had up to a million followers in 1938 and is still active today on a smaller scale. Upon Ballard's death, several members founded their own splinter groups, adding their own beliefs and teachings to those of the original movement.

The parent organization of the movement is the Saint Germain Foundation, which maintains its worldwide headquarters in Schaumburg, Illinois. In 2007, the Foundation's website said the movement was represented internationally by 300 groups, operating under names such as "'I AM' Sanctuary" and "'I AM' Temple." As of 2025, the website describes "hundreds" of Sanctuaries and Temples, in major cities throughout the United States, Canada, Western Europe, and Australia; additional groups are located in Latin America, India, and Africa. The organization has stated that its purpose is "spiritual, educational and practical", and that no admission fee is charged for their activities.

The term "I AM" is a reference to the ancient Sanskrit mantra So Ham and the divine biblical name "I Am that I Am".

== Overview ==
The "I AM" Activity was influenced by the teachings of Helena Blavatsky and William Quan Judge, two of the founders of the original Theosophical Society. The movement also adopted elements of New Thought. To these spiritual movements, Ballard added a strong nationalistic flavor, claiming a new golden age would emerge in the United States.

The Ballards also borrowed from William Dudley Pelley's spiritual writings, with Edna allegedly attending several classes offered by Pelley. While there are no indications that Pelley was a member of I AM, Ballard early on recruited several members of his fascist organization, the Silver Legion of America.

The movement believes in the existence of a group called the "ascended masters", a hierarchy of supernatural beings that includes the original theosophical masters such as Jesus, El Morya Khan, Maitreya, and in addition several dozen more beyond the original 20 Masters of the Ancient Wisdom of the original theosophists as described by Helena Petrovna Blavatsky.

These ascended masters are believed to be humans who have lived in a succession of reincarnations in physical bodies or cosmic beings (beings originated from the great central sun of light in the beginning of all times). Over time, those who have passed through various "embodiments" became highly advanced souls, are able to move beyond the cycles of "re-embodiments" and karma, and attained their "ascension", becoming immortal. Ascended masters are believed to communicate to humanity through certain trained messengers per Blavatsky, including Guy and Edna Ballard. Because Jesus is believed to be one of the ascended masters, making the "Christ Light" available to seekers who wish to move out of darkness, many of the members of the "I AM" Activity consider it to be a Christian religion. According to the Los Angeles Magazine, Ballard said he was the re-embodiment of George Washington, an Egyptian priest, and a noted French musician.

Ballard died in 1939. In 1942, his wife and son were convicted of mail fraud, a conviction which was overturned in a landmark Supreme Court ruling (United States v. Ballard) which determined that the beliefs the Ballards espoused should not have been submitted to a jury regardless of their veracity.

== History ==
=== Founding ===
The "I AM" Activity was founded by Guy Ballard (pseudonym Godfré Ray King) in the early 1930s. Ballard was well-read in theosophy and its offshoots, and he claimed to have met and been instructed by a man who introduced himself as "Saint Germain" while hiking on Mount Shasta looking for a rumored branch of the Great White Brotherhood known as "The Brotherhood of Mount Shasta". Saint Germain is regular component of theosophical religions as an ascended master, based on the historical Comte de Saint-Germain, an 18th-century adventurer.

The Ballards said they began talking to the ascended masters regularly. They founded a publishing house, Saint Germain Press, to publish their books and began training people to spread their messages across the United States. These training sessions and "conclaves" were held throughout the United States, open to the general public and free of charge. A front-page story in a 1938 edition of the Chicago Herald and Examiner noted that the Ballards "do not take up collections or ask for funds". Meetings became limited to members only after hecklers began disrupting their open meetings. Over their lifetimes, the Ballards recorded nearly 4000 live dictations, which they said were from the ascended masters. Guy Ballard, his wife Edna, and later their son Donald, became the sole "accredited messengers" of the ascended masters. In 1942, they began the I AM Sanctuary at a former Presbyterian missionary school.

=== Popularity ===
The Ballards' popularity spread, including up to a million followers in 1938. Donations were not formally required, but it was made clear that they were necessary in order to receive blessings from the masters.

The first of many "conclaves" held in scores of cities in their national tours was Philadelphia, Pennsylvania, October 10–19, 1934. According to a Los Angeles Magazine article, in August 1935, the Ballards hosted a gathering at the Shrine Auditorium in Los Angeles that drew a crowd of 6,000. Guy Ballard spoke under the pseudonym he used in authoring his books, Godfre Ray King, and his wife used the pseudonym Lotus. The meeting included teachings they described as being received directly from the ascended masters. They led the audience in prayers and affirmations that they called decrees, including adorations to God and invocations for abundance of every good thing, including love, money, peace, and happiness.

The "I AM" Activity spread to parts of Canada, entering Alberta in 1937, with the first meetings held in Calgary, organized by a telegraph operator who had brought back a copy of Unveiled Mysteries from California. A second group was started in Edmonton, and the movement grew in Alberta until Ballard's death in 1939, then declined with the United States government's denial of mailing privileges in 1940. A slight revival of the group in Alberta came in 1945, with a new policy of lending literature, but by 1947, it was estimated there were less than 100 followers in the province.

=== Guy Ballard's death and splintering ===
At the height of his popularity, Guy Ballard died from arteriosclerosis at 5:00 A.M. on December 29, 1939, in Los Angeles, in the home of his son Donald. On December 31 his body was cremated. On New Year's Day during the annual Christmas Class, Edna Ballard stated that Guy had completed his Ascension at midnight December 31, 1939, from the "Royal Teton Retreat".

Ballard's death deeply affected the movement, which saw several splinter groups emerge.

- I AM former member Geraldine Innocente (whom the Ascended Master El Morya, who wrote under the pseudonym of Thomas Printz, had asked to form a new activity for the dissemination of the spiritual teaching) quickly founded an offshoot of the movement, targeting the Spanish-speaking community.
- Francis Ekey, another member, founded Lighthouse of Freedom to offer classes allegedly disseminating the teachings of ancient masters.
- One of Ekey's collaborators, Mark Prophet, founded the Keepers of the Summit Lighthouse in 1958. To I AM's teachings, Prophet added a proclivity for conspiracy thinking, UFOs and a staunch opposition to communism. His wife Elizabeth Clare Wulf would eventually share leadership and succeed him, rebranding the organization as the Church Universal and Triumphant.
- Important elements of Ballard's theology, symbolism and nationalism can also be found in Romana Didulo's movement in the 2020s. These include the use of decrees, the purple flame and the mythological ascended masters.

=== Copyright infringement civil action ===
In 1941, the Ballards were sued for copyright infringement by the family and estate of Frederick Spencer Oliver (1866–1899), "amenuensis" of the novel A Dweller on Two Planets, first published in 1905. The suit was dismissed for failure to state cause of action. District Judge Dawkins quoted the original foreword to Oliver's book in its entirety, wherein Oliver emphasized that he was not the author but had channeled the book from the spirit of a previously deceased person with the intent of preserving and conveying the story and teachings of that person's world; and the book had been copyrighted with Oliver as a proprietor, not as the author. Judge Dawkins pointed out that the Ballards had stated they were using similar methods to write their books and that this in itself wasn't enough to uphold the action in court.

=== Fraud trial of Edna and Donald Ballard ===
Based on statements made in books sent via the mail, Edna Ballard and her son Donald were charged with eighteen counts of mail fraud in 1942. The presiding judge instructed the jury not to consider the truth or falsity of the religious beliefs, but only whether the Ballards sincerely believed the claims or did not, and the jury found them guilty. The Ninth Circuit overturned the conviction on the grounds that the judge improperly excluded the credibility of their religious beliefs from consideration, and the government appealed to the Supreme Court. In United States v. Ballard, the Supreme Court in a 5–4 landmark decision held that the question of whether Ballards believed their religious claims should not have been submitted to the jury, and remanded the case back to the Ninth Circuit, which affirmed the fraud conviction. Interpreting this decision, the Ninth Circuit later found that the Court did not go so far as to hold that "the validity or veracity of a religious doctrine cannot be inquired into by a Federal Court".

On a second appeal, the Supreme Court in 1946 vacated the fraud conviction, on the grounds that women were improperly excluded from the jury panel.

=== Relocation to Santa Fe and Edna Ballard's death ===
In March 1942, Edna Ballard moved the western branch of the Saint Germain Press and her residence to Santa Fe, where she recorded live before an audience thousands more dictations she said were from the Ascended Masters.

Despite the ultimate dismissal of the court cases, it was not until 1954 that the organization's right to use the mail was restored. The Internal Revenue Service revoked their tax-exempt status in 1941, stating it did not recognize the movement as "a religion". A court ruling in 1957 overturned the ruling of the IRS and re-established the group's tax-exempt status.

Following a brief illness, Edna Ballard died in her Chicago home on February 10, 1971. A memorial was held several days later at the "I AM" Sanctuary in Mount Shasta, California. Her death was not widely publicized until June, reportedly because "the movement does not believe in death".

=== Recent history and present day ===
As of 2007, Saint Germain Foundation maintains a reading room in Mount Shasta, California, and its headquarters in Schaumburg, Illinois. Several annual conclaves are held at their 12-story "I AM Temple" at 176 West Washington Street in downtown Chicago. The Saint Germain Press, a subsidiary of the Saint Germain Foundation, estimates they printed and put into circulation over one million books.

The Saint Germain Foundation presents an annual pageant every August at Mount Shasta since 1950, a tradition only interrupted by the COVID pandemic.

== Teachings ==
According to the group's teachings, ascended masters are believed to be individuals who have left the reincarnation cycle of re-embodiment. The "I AM" Activity calls itself Christian; Jesus is considered one of the more important ascended masters.

Ballard's teachings included significant nationalistic and patriotic elements. According to Ballard's teachings, the faithful's rituals would allow the United States to lead the world into a new golden age of civilization, and St. Germain inspired the United States Declaration of Independence. In addition, through the use of prayers and rituals, the "lightbearers" in the US would reverse the bad karma that had accumulated and was holding humanity back from attaining its godly existence.

The movement teaches that the omnipotent, omniscient and omnipresent creator God ('I AM' – Exodus 3:14) is in all of us as a spark from the Divine Flame, and that we can experience this presence, love, power and light – and its power of the Violet Consuming Flame of Divine Love – through quiet contemplation and by repeating 'affirmations' and 'decrees'. By affirming something one desires, one may cause it to happen.

The group teaches that the "Mighty I AM Presence" is God existing in and as each person's higher self, and that a light known as the "violet flame" is generated by the "I AM Presence". That "flame" may surround each person who calls forth the action of the Holy Spirit for expressions of mercy or forgiveness. The group believes that, by tapping into these internalized powers in accordance with the teachings of the ascended masters, one can use one's relationship to the "presence" to amplify the expressions of virtue such as justice, peace, harmony, and love; to displace or abate the expression of evil (i.e., the relative absence of good) in the world; and to minimize personal difficulties in one's life.

The spiritual goal of the teachings is that, by a process of self-purification through the symbol of the "Violet Consuming Flame", the believer may attain the perfected condition of the saints or become an ascended master when leaving their body (in contrast to common concepts of ordinary death). The practice of "decrees" (repeated prayers given aloud with conviction), served at times as commands from the masters or as a request from the faithful, adds to practitioners' likelihood of reaching self-purification.

An example of a decree, recorded at I AM study groups in Alberta in the late 1930s:

"In the Name, by the Power, through the Love, in the Authority and unto the Glory of the Mighty I Am Presence we now offer ourselves as a channel to YOU, Blessed Master Saint Germain, Jesus, Nada, Great Divine Director and Legions of Light! Blaze through us! Blaze through us! Blaze though us! The Mighty Golden Power of Divine Love and Charge the Energy in the Gas Belts below the Earth's Surface with that Mighty Power!"

This decree was followed by a note giving additional instruction:

On the word "Charge" bring the hands down to your sides with dynamic energy but be perfectly relaxed. Visualise and feel GREAT COSMIC STREAMS OF GOLDEN LIGHT SUBSTANCE blazing down through you from great BEAMS above you. This actually takes place, streaming like an avalanche through your body, hands and feed, flooding into the gas belts below the earth's surface.

The group also emphasizes personal freedom as essential to spiritual development.

These "positive thinking" beliefs overlap with several movements, such as New Thought, New Age movement, and the Human Potential Movement.

== See also ==
- Exaltation (Mormonism)
- Robert LeFevre
- Mirra Alfassa
- Supermind (integral yoga)

== Bibliography ==
- Saint Germain Foundation. The History of the "I AM" Activity and Saint Germain Foundation. Saint Germain Press 2003 ISBN 1-878891-99-5
- King, Godfre Ray. Unveiled Mysteries. Saint Germain Press. ISBN 1-878891-00-6
- King, Godfre Ray. The Magic Presence. Saint Germain Press. ISBN 1-878891-06-5
- Saint Germain. I AM Discourses. Saint Germain Press. ISBN 1-878891-48-0
- Peter Mt. Shasta. "Lady Master Pearl, My Teacher." Church of the Seven Rays. ISBN 978-0692356661
