= Theosophy in Scandinavia =

Theosophy in Scandinavia is represented by many independent lodges.

About 1890 the first theosophical lodges were founded in Scandinavia. When in 1895 the seventh lodge was founded, a "Scandinavian Section" of the TS Adyar with headquarters in Stockholm was established. It was a practice that after seven lodges were founded in one country, a "Section" in that country could be founded. In 1907 the Finnish Section was founded, and in 1921 the Icelandic Section.

In the 1970s the members of the lodges of the Danish Section began to study the works of Alice Bailey. The TS Adyar was opposed to the teachings of Bailey, and this situation led to a crisis, so that the Danish Section left the TS Adyar in 1989 and became independent.

== Independent organisations ==
The Danish TS voted in August 1989 for the creation of an independent Teosofisk Forening (Theosophical Union). Other lodges were integrated in this organisation. In November 1997 the name was changed to Theosophical Association Scandinavia (TAS). In August 2004 ten theosophical organisations from Denmark and Norway founded in Aarhus the Teosofisk Netværk or Teosofisk Nettverk (Theosophical Network).

Members of the Theosophical Network are:

- In Denmark:
  - The Golden Circle - Den Gyldne Cirkel) (on Seeland
  - Theosophical Association Aalborg - Teosofisk Forening Aalborg)
  - Theosophical Association Aarhus - Teosofisk Forening Århus)
  - Theosophical Association Frederikshavn - Teosofisk Forening Frederikshavn
  - Theosophical Association Fyn - Teosofisk Forening Fyn
  - Theosophical Association Copenhagen - Teosofisk Forening København
  - Theosophical Association Naestved - Teosofisk Forening Næstved
- In Norway:
  - Theosophical Association Stavanger - Teosofisk Forening Stavanger
  - Theosophical Association Telemark/Vestfold - Teosofisk Forening Telemark/Vestfold
  - Theosophical Center Oslo - Teosofisk Senter Oslo

There are also other theosophical organisations in Scandinavia that are not part of the Network.

Some members of independent theosophical organisations in Scandinavia also participated in the World Parliament of Religions in Barcelona in 2004.

The TS Adyar has lodges in Finland, Sweden and Norway, and the TS Pasadena has lodges in Finland and Sweden. The ULT has lodges in Sweden.
