= Turanians =

Turanian is a term that has been used in reference to diverse groups of people. Many of the uses of the word are obsolete. It may refer to:

- An Iranic ethnic group mentioned in the Avesta
  - See Turanian (Avesta)
  - See Turan
- The Turanid race
- Any historical people of Transoxiana or present-day Turkestan
- Obsolete term for any historical people speaking languages of the obsolete Ural–Altaic family, in particular:
  - The Huns
  - Finno-Ugric peoples like the Finns, Estonians and Hungarians

== See also ==
- Hungarian Turanism
- Turanian languages
