= Guy Ballard =

American religious leader

Guy Warren Ballard
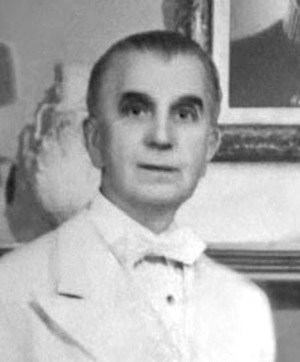
- Born: July 28, 1878; Newton, Kansas, United States
- Died: December 29, 1939 (aged 61)
- Other names: Godfré Ray King
- Occupation: Mining engineer
- Known for: Founder of the "I AM" Activity
- Spouse: Edna Anne Wheeler Ballard
- Children: Donald Ballard

Guy Warren Ballard (July 28, 1878 – December 29, 1939) was an American mining engineer who, with his wife Edna Anne Wheeler Ballard, founded the "I AM" Activity.

Ballard was born in Newton, Kansas and married his wife in Chicago in 1916. Ballard served in the U.S. Army in World War I, and then became a mining engineer. Both Edna and Guy studied Theosophy and the occult extensively.

== Revelation ==
Living at the base of the California volcano Mount Shasta in 1930, Ballard frequently hiked on the mountain, where he reported the following to have occurred.

It came time for lunch, and I sought a mountain spring for clear, cold water. Cup in hand, I bent down to fill it, when an electrical current passed through my body from head to foot.

I looked around, and directly behind me stood a young man who, at first glance, seemed to be someone on a hike like myself. I looked more closely and realized immediately that he was no ordinary person. As this thought passed through my mind, he smiled and addressed me saying:

"My Brother, if you will hand me your cup, I will give you a much more refreshing drink than spring water." I obeyed, and instantly the cup was filled with a creamy liquid. Handing it back to me, he said: "Drink it."

The young man later identified himself as the Count of St. Germain. Ballard provided details of his encounters with St. Germain and other Ascended Masters in the books Unveiled Mysteries and The Magic Presence, using the pen name Godfré Ray King.

Guy Ballard, his wife Edna, and their son Edona Eros "Donald" Ballard (1918-1973) claimed to be the sole "accredited messengers" of Saint Germain. Their teachings constitute the original nucleus of what are today called the "Ascended Master Teachings" and are still used in "I AM" Sanctuaries all over the world.

== Activity ==
The "I AM" Activity started from public lectures about these encounters and grew rapidly in the 1930s. Ballard lectured frequently in Chicago about Saint Germain's mystical teachings, in which America was destined to play a key role. By 1938, there were claimed to be about a million followers in the United States. In 1942, they began the I AM Sanctuary at a Presbyterian missionary school.

The "I AM" Activity describes itself as an apolitical, spiritual, and educational organization financed by contributions from its members. Its parent organization is Saint Germain Foundation, with headquarters in Schaumburg, Illinois, a suburb of Chicago.

The "I AM" Activity began after Mr. Ballard's alleged meeting with Saint Germain, an Ascended Master, whose experiences are outlined in Volume One of the Saint Germain Series of Books, "Unveiled Mysteries", published by the Saint Germain Press.

== Deaths of Ballard and his wife ==
Ballard died on 29 December 1939 and Edna Ballard died on 12 February 1971. A new dispensation was reputedly given so that the "ascension" could be gained (in the finer body) without taking the physical body, as Jesus had done. The "ascended master bodies" were reputedly already prepared for Ballard and Edna Ballard as noted in Unveiled Mysteries by Godfre Ray King (the pen name of Guy Ballard). It is reported that both Ballards ascended upon passing out of the physical body. Godfre Ray King has also reputedly given dictations through Edna Ballard (under the pen name of "Lotus Ray King"). Given the "I AM" Activity, old occult laws have been replaced including the teaching of Theosophy that, to become a master, a person would have had to ascend upon death to the fifth level of initiation.

Adherents of the Ascended Master Teachings believe that Guy Ballard became the "Ascended Master Godfre" after his death, and that his previous incarnations include Richard the Lionheart and George Washington. They also believe that Edna Ballard became the "Ascended Lady Master Lotus", with previous incarnations including Joan of Arc, Elizabeth I of England, and Benjamin Franklin.
