= Benjamin Creme =

Scottish esoteric writer (1922–2016)

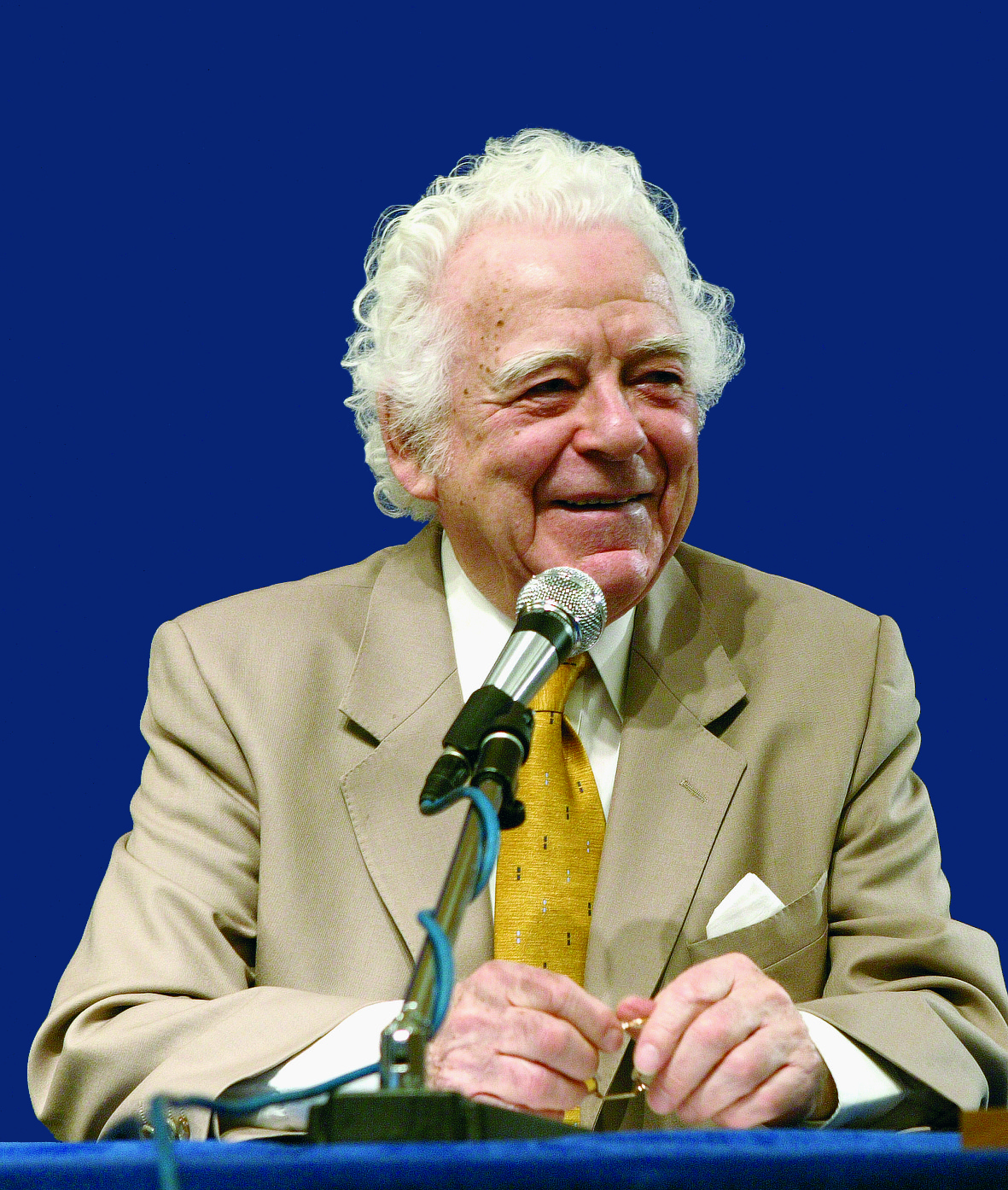
- Lecturing in Paris, 17 March 2006
- Born: 5 December 1922; Glasgow, Scotland
- Died: 24 October 2016 (aged 93); London, England
- Occupations: artist, author, esotericist
- Known for: Views on the second coming

Benjamin Creme (5 December 1922 − 24 October 2016) was a Scottish artist, esoteric writer, and editor of Share International magazine.

Creme asserted that the Second Coming, prophesied by many religions, would come in the form of Maitreya, the World Teacher. Maitreya is the name Buddhists use for the future Buddha, but Creme believed that Maitreya is the teacher that all religions point towards and hope for. Creme maintained that Maitreya had returned in a physical form, descended from the Himalayas, and then moved to London on 19 July 1977.

In 1980 Creme stated, “We are moving into a period of climax, leading to events which will fundamentally alter life as we know it. Tremendous changes are taking place in all departments of life, preparatory to the establishment of entirely new modes of social living and relationship, based on sharing and cooperation. To some people, this portends the Second Coming of the Christ. To others, it is the realization that only through a profound inner change and readiness for a new direction in our political, economic, and social life can humanity survive. Is it not possible that both of these are correct?”

== Early life ==
Born in Glasgow, Scotland, in 1922, Benjamin Creme's life and work followed two distinct interests – art and esotericism – which eventually merged as a single path. At the age of thirteen Creme began painting, inspired by the works of Rembrandt. In order to become a painter, he left school at sixteen. Over the years, Creme befriended and collaborated with many fixtures of the time in British art, music, and literature, developing into a painter in the Modernist style. His style of painting has also been categorized as "abstractly representational", and his work has been exhibited by galleries around the world.

== Spiritual interests ==
In direct parallel to his artistic exploration, Creme said he became interested in the occult at the age of fourteen, when he read With Mystics and Magicians in Tibet by Alexandra David-Neel. Over the years, Creme studied the works of Helena Blavatsky and Alice Bailey, as well as those of Charles Webster Leadbeater, Paul Brunton, George Gurdjieff, Peter Ouspensky and Maurice Nicoll; along with Patanjali, Vivekananda, Sivananda, Yogananda, Krishnamurti, and Ramana Maharshi, all of whom described the existence of a kingdom beyond that of the Human. Creme reiterated that it was this Spiritual Kingdom, or Fifth Kingdom on Earth, that has helped guide human evolution since Humanity's inception. Creme explained further about how this Kingdom, or Spiritual Hierarchy, is composed of Masters of Wisdom – great beings who have mastered themselves over many life-times.

Creme said that he was first contacted telepathically by his Master in January 1959, when Creme was asked to make tape recordings of his Master's messages. Creme first began to speak publicly of his mission on 30 May 1975, at the Friends Meeting House on Euston Road in London, England. His central message announced the emergence of this group of enlightened spiritual teachers who would guide humanity forward into a new epoch, the Aquarian Age of peace and brotherhood, based on the principles of love and sharing. At the head of this group would be the one who occupies the office the World Teacher, expected by all the major religions as their "Awaited One": the Christ to the Christians; the Imam Mahdi to the Muslims; the Messiah for Jews; and the 5th Buddha (i.e., Maitreya) for Buddhists. Creme revealed that this great teacher was actually the head of the Master’s of Wisdom, and that his personal name was Maitreya. As early as 1982, however, Creme emphasized that Maitreya would reveal himself fully only when Humanity began to live in right relationship to one another – most notably, by living in peace, and by beginning to share the world's resources more equitably.

== Predictions in 1982 and later ==
Creme's magazine Share International, featuring one of his artworks

In the spring of 1982 Creme placed advertisements in newspapers around the world announcing, "The Christ is now here." At that time Creme attempted to prepare a worldwide audience for the existence of Maitreya, along with his plans and priorities, by announcing that there would be television broadcasts on this subject. Creme then stated in these newspaper advertisements that Maitreya’s open emergence was to begin within the next two months. These series of announcements culminated on 14 May 1982, when Creme held a press conference in Los Angeles where more than 90 reporters attended. Creme alerted those present that Maitreya was then living within the Asian community in the Brick Lane area of London. Creme also underscored the importance of humanity's involvement in these happenings (as humanity's freewill is viewed by higher spiritual beings as sacrosanct). Thus Creme presented the reporters with this challenge: If the media made a serious attempt to research the story and locate Maitreya in London, Maitreya would reveal himself openly to them. Afterwards, Creme would report, "It was hoped that the media would respond to my information at a level which would allow Him to come forward to them. This hope, however, was not fulfilled. While the media did show an interest in the reappearance story, it did not go so far as to actually get involved in searching for Maitreya."

After 1982, Creme made a number of additional predictions and announcements about the advent of Maitreya, based on his claims of receiving telepathic messages from a Master of Wisdom. Creme said that in January 1986, Maitreya contacted media representatives at the highest level in Britain who agreed to make an announcement about Maitreya's existence and stature. Under pressure from high religious and government officials, however, these statements were withheld.

Nonetheless, Creme wrote, "On 26 February 1987 Maitreya gave an interview to the major American television company, Cable News Network (CNN). He was interviewed under His ordinary, everyday name, and did not call Himself the Christ. He did say, however, that, among other names, He was known as Maitreya. A group of His closest associates journeyed to the United States to arrange further interviews….The CNN interview was made available for possible showing in 26 of a promised 29 countries in Europe, Scandinavia, North Africa and the Middle East, but was not broadcast in the United States. The CNN office in Atlanta maintained that they could not see a framework in which to present the interview.”

Creme knew opposition to his message would be strong, not merely from atheists and age-old religious organizations, but also from those wishing to preserve the status quo. He stated, “There is no doubt that there will be opposition from the more privileged members of society who will see, in the changes which must ensue, a loss of their traditional status and power; but the need for change will become so overwhelmingly obvious, that they will find themselves increasingly powerless to stop the momentum. The present caste system must go, in the interest of the one humanity.”

In 1997 Creme again announced that there would be additional, global TV broadcasts from the Christ, although the media outlets remained largely passive or uninterested. Creme nevertheless asserted that there would be a Day of Declaration: "The Christ will come on the world's television channels, linked together by satellite. All those with access to television will see Him but He will not speak. He will establish a telepathic rapport with all humanity simultaneously…many hundreds of thousands of spontaneous 'miracle' cures will take place simultaneously."

On 14 January 2010, Creme said that Maitreya had given the first interview which aired on American television. Soon afterwards, several people in the United States working from Creme's predictions concluded that the British-American economist and author Raj Patel was Maitreya. After newspaper articles spread this story around the world Creme responded that Raj Patel was not the coming World Teacher in an article in The Guardian under the headline "Raj Patel is Not Maitreya, But the World Teacher is Here — and Needed."

Creme gave lectures around the world for more than 30 years about Maitreya, and a network of volunteers worked with him to give his views to the public. In speaking about his work, Creme said: "My job has been to make the initial approach to the public, to help create a climate of hope and expectancy. If I can do that, I'll be well pleased."

Although most press coverage of Creme and his information has been skeptical, some members of the news media had positive views of him, such as Canadian broadcasting host/producer Max Allen, who stated, "The Maitreya story is important and Creme is an admirable spokesman." Creme died in October 2016 at the age of 93.

== Crop circles and UFOs ==
From 1957 to 1959 Creme was the vice-president of the Aetherius Society, an organization that maintained that UFOs existed and that the other planets in the Solar System were inhabited and supported life, although Humanity had yet to develop etheric sight to ascertain this. The organization's beliefs were based largely on Theosophy, which integrates the study of religion, philosophy, and science, branching not merely into the Occult but also cosmology. For Theosophists, planets are evolving, living beings that host their own Spiritual Hierarchies.

In 1958, Creme met George Adamski and said he could personally vouch for the authenticity of Adamski's UFO contacts. Creme maintained that most of the UFOs that travelled to Earth came from Mars and Venus, in space-ships manufactured on Mars through a process in which thoughts have the power to materialize things. In addition, Creme believed that the most highly evolved beings of Mars and Venus (that are visible only on the etheric level) have long played a role in not merely uplifting early animal-man, but also in protecting Humanity from its own self by sending UFOs to heal the Earth's negativity and pollution. Creme asserted that nuclear radiation was the most dangerous of all pollution, while emphasizing that all the nuclear power plants continually leak, but such seepage escapes scientific measurements at this time as radioactive pollution exists largely on the etheric plane. Creme underscored that it is there that the radioactive waste does the most harm; it is in that realm that nuclear power threatens all life on our planet and beyond.

During an interview in 2006 Creme confirmed his views on the importance of UFOs and their role in creating crop circles. "The crop circles are there to draw attention to the fact that the Space Brothers are there... They are made in seconds by the 'ships' of the Space Brothers...They appear all over the world, but the majority are in the South of England. Why? Because Maitreya is in London."

Over time, Creme explained how interdependent Humanity's existence has been with other, far more advanced, planetary civilizations. He underscored that "the UFOs have an enormous part to play in the security of this planet at the ecological level. [The crop circles are part of] a new science that will give us energy directly from the sun. Oil will become a thing of the past. No one will be able to sell energy in the future."

== Predictions and responses ==
Creme asserted that Maitreya was the World Teacher for the Age of Aquarius, and that during the transition of one astrological cycle to another humans undergo a quickening of their evolution, while experiencing crisis after crisis. Creme underscored that Maitreya "comes to show that the spiritual life can be lived in every department of human living ― not alone in the religious field; that the scientific path to God, about which he will teach, is wide enough and varied enough to accommodate all men. Everyone, in the future, will come to realize the spiritual basis of life, and will seek to give it expression in his work. And whereas today only the seer or the mystic knows the true meaning of reality, this will be the experience of all men, whatever their way. Not all men are religious; religion is a way, a specific way."

Between 1989 and 1991, Creme's magazine Share International published a series of excerpts of talks purportedly given by Maitreya in the London area, recorded by a close associate, and then transmitted to two journalists, Patricha Pitchon and Brian James. Covering modern problems such as addiction, crime, and corruption, Maitreya's dialogues proposed the technique of "honesty of mind, sincerity of spirit and detachment" as the cure, leading to growing awareness. The excerpts also contained prognostications of future world events, including the Fall of the Berlin Wall, the ending of Communist rule in the Soviet Union, the release of Nelson Mandela and the ending of Apartheid in South Africa, the release of Terry Waite, the resignation of Margaret Thatcher, and many more.

Sceptics ridiculed the story presented by Benjamin Creme, noting that a few of the predictions were incorrect. Some fundamentalist Evangelical Christian sources and other detractors accused Creme of being part of a satanic conspiracy and placed him among a number of "antichrist potentials". Yet Creme emphasized that those who read his own books or listened to his lectures would do best to engage actively with the information he presented, and to verify it for themselves. Creme stated, "I have never presented Maitreya as a messiah figure who comes to make all things bright and beautiful for a supine humanity. Maitreya himself is at pains to clarify his position that every stone and brick of the new civilisation must be put in place by humanity itself; humanity's free will is sacrosanct."

== Bibliography ==
- Creme, Benjamin (1979). The Reappearance of the Christ and the Masters of Wisdom. Tara Press. ISBN 978-0950679709.
- Creme, Benjamin (1980). Messages from Maitreya the Christ. Vol. 1. Tara Press. ISBN 978-0936604015.
- Creme, Benjamin (1983). Transmission: A Meditation for the New Age. Tara Center. ISBN 978-0936604022.
- Creme, Benjamin, ed. (1985). A Master Speaks: Articles from Share International. Share International Foundation. ISBN 9071484017.
- Creme, Benjamin (1986). Maitreya's Mission. Share International Foundation. ISBN 978-9071484025.
- Creme, Benjamin (1993). Maitreya's Mission. Vol. 2. Share International Foundation. ISBN 978-9071484117.
- Creme, Benjamin (1993). Maitreya's Mission. Vol. 3. Share International Foundation. ISBN 978-9071484155.
- Creme, Benjamin (1996). The Ageless Wisdom Teaching. Share International Foundation. ISBN 978-9071484131.
- Creme, Benjamin (2001). The Great Approach: New Light and Life for Humanity. Share International Foundation. ISBN 978-9071484230.
- Creme, Benjamin (2002). The Art of Co-operation. Share International Foundation. ISBN 978-9071484261.
- Creme, Benjamin (2005). Maitreya's Teachings: The Laws of Life. Share International Foundation. ISBN 978-9071484001.
- Creme, Benjamin (2006). The Art of Living: Living within the Laws of Life. Share International Foundation. ISBN 978-9071484377.
- Creme, Benjamin (2007). The World Teacher for All Humanity. Share International Foundation. ISBN 978-9071484391.
- Creme, Benjamin (2008). The Awakening of Humanity. Share International Foundation. ISBN 978-9071484414.

== See also ==
- Helena Roerich
- List of Maitreya claimants
- UFO religion
