= Jesus in Theosophy =

Theosophical concept of Jesus Christ

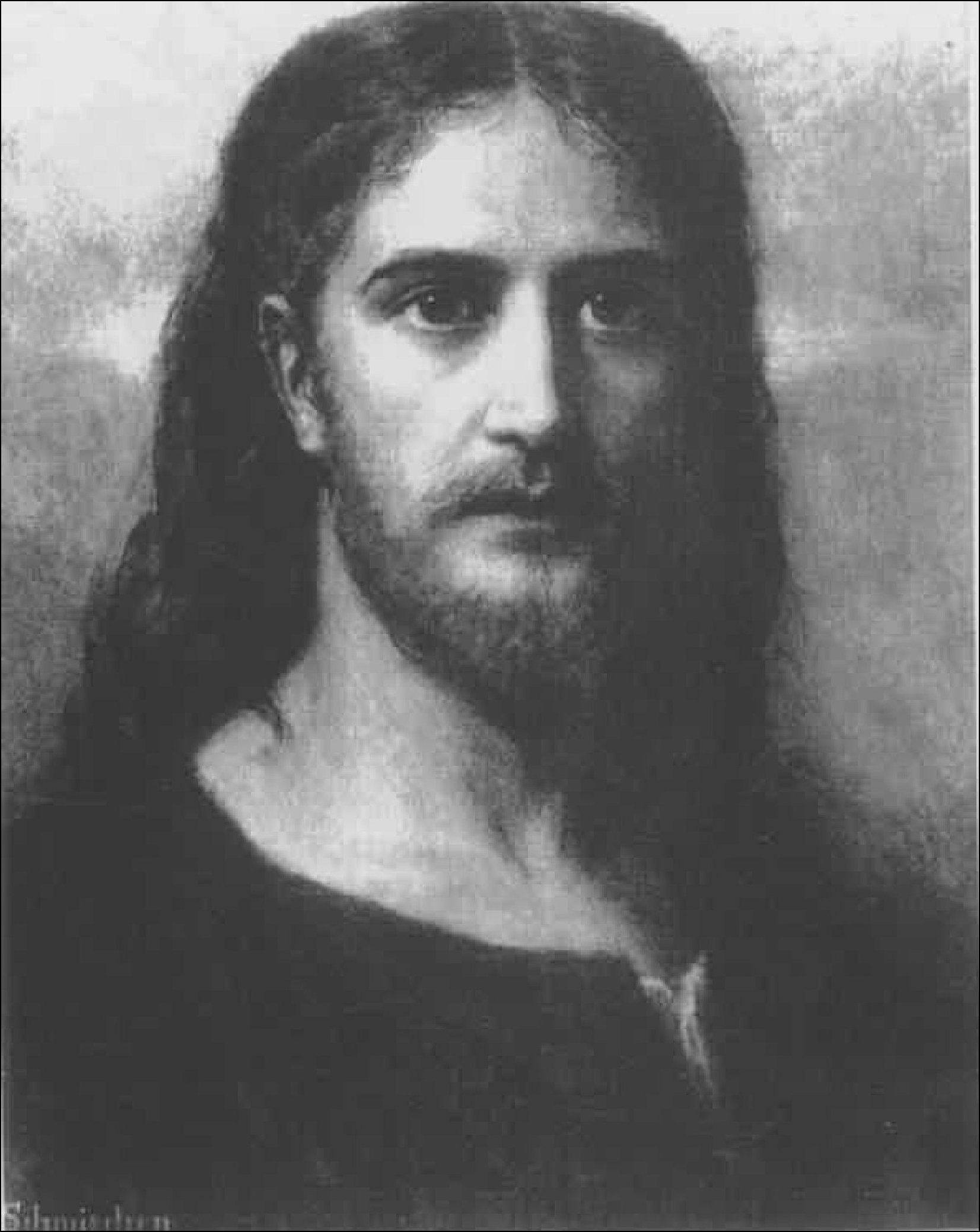
Portrait of Jesus, by the Theosophist and painter Hermann Schmiechen (1910).

Master Jesus is the theosophical concept of Jesus in Theosophy and the Ascended Master Teachings.

== Position in the Hierarchy of Masters of the Ancient Wisdom ==
The Master Jesus is one of the Masters of the Ancient Wisdom in Theosophy and is one of the Ascended Masters (also collectively called the Great White Brotherhood; with white being in reference to the light) in the Ascended Master Teachings, a group of religions based on Theosophy. The Master Jesus is regarded by Theosophists, was regarded by Alice Bailey, and was later regarded by students of the "Ascended Master Teachings" as the Master of the Sixth Ray.

It is believed by Ascended Master Teachings organizations that the Master Jesus was "Chohan of the Sixth Ray" until December 31, 1959, when, according to Elizabeth Clare Prophet, Lady Master Nada fully took on that Office in the Spiritual Hierarchy. According to Prophet, Jesus became World Teacher, along with Kuthumi, on January 1, 1956, succeeding Maitreya, who took the Office of "Planetary Buddha" and "Cosmic Christ". This belief is not accepted by adherents of traditional Theosophy and the followers of Alice A. Bailey and Benjamin Creme; they believe that the Master Jesus is still the Chohan of the Sixth Ray and that Maitreya is still the World Teacher.

== Previous incarnations ==
According to Elizabeth Clare Prophet, the Prophet of the Church Universal and Triumphant, the largest Ascended Master Teachings religion, the Master Jesus incarnated twice as the Emperor of Atlantis, once in 33,050 BC and again in 15,000 BC. He did this in order to aid the white magicians in the war of the white magicians and the black magicians that was going on in Atlantis at that time.

According to Alice A. Bailey, the Master Jesus was previously incarnated as Joshua, the Hebrew military leader in the 13th century BC, and Joshua the High Priest in the sixth century BC.

According to the Ascended Master Teachings, Jesus was also incarnated as Joseph of the coat of many colors in the 17th century BC/16th century BC (approximately between 1650 BC and 1550 BC), as well as King David (who lived c. 1037 BC until around 970 BC), and Elisha in the 9th century BC.

== Family and birth ==
It is believed in the Ascended Master Teachings that Jesus’ father Saint Joseph was one of the incarnations of St. Germain, and that his mother Mary, upon her Assumption became either a deva or an archangel and is now the twin flame (celestial wife) of the Archangel Raphael.

According to the Ascended Master Teachings, each of the Magi who came to visit the baby Jesus was an incarnation of one of the ascended masters: Caspar, who gave the gift of gold to Jesus, was an incarnation of Djwal Khul; Balthasar, who gave the gift of frankincense to Jesus, was an incarnation of Kuthumi; and Melchior, who gave the gift of myrrh to Jesus, was an incarnation of Morya.

== Activities between the ages of twelve and thirty ==
According to the Ascended Master Teachings, to prepare for his ministry, Jesus first studied at the Brotherhood of Luxor (a mystery school in Egypt), and then went to India to study under the Great Divine Director, Maitreya, and Lord Himalaya, the Manu of the Fourth Root Race (Atlantean).

== Ministry ==
The followers of Benjamin Creme and Alice A. Bailey believe in the Nestorian/Gnostic Christology, promulgated by C.W. Leadbeater, which asserts that the powerful being known as the Maitreya overshadowed the Master Jesus during the Ministry of Jesus, such that there were two beings in one body. Maitreya was the Christ and the Master Jesus was Jesus of Nazareth; the combination of the two beings functioned as Jesus Christ. Those adherent to the Ascended Master Teachings believe in the existence of the Maitreya; however, they believe that although he encouraged the mission of Jesus, he did not actually overshadow Jesus.

== Crucifixion ==
Theosophists and those adherent to the Ascended Master Teachings alike believe that the Master Jesus underwent the fourth level of initiation (the crucifixion) at his crucifixion in Jerusalem. According to Alice A. Bailey, for most people at the fourth initiation the crucifixion is symbolic as a severe life test of renunciation, but for Jesus it was literal.

== Activities between the resurrection and the ascension ==
Traditional theosophists believe that the Master Jesus and Maitreya souls' separated from each other just after the Ascension (which for Jesus was only to the fourth and not the fifth level of initiation) and do not believe that the Master Jesus went to Kashmir; they believe he went directly to Shamballa to be with the Lord of the World, Sanat Kumara, for a time, until he then incarnated again soon after as Apollonius of Tyana.

It is believed in the Ascended Master Teachings that when Jesus ascended on the 3rd day after the resurrection, he levitated from Judaea to Kashmir.

== Day of Pentecost ==
In either case, whether he went directly to Shamballa or to Kashmir when he ascended, presumably he teleported to a location above Judaea briefly ten days later on the 50th day after his resurrection in order to observe from afar the events of the Day of Pentecost (or possibly he observed these events by remote viewing). In both traditional Theosophy and the Ascended Master Teachings it is believed that these events were coordinated by the Maha Chohan, who, it is asserted by both C.W. Leadbeater and Elizabeth Clare Prophet, is the representative of the Holy Ghost on Earth.

== Activities after the day of Pentecost ==
In the Ascended Master Teachings, it is believed that the Master Jesus lived in Kashmir until he was 81, and then, assuming he had been born in 6 BC, in AD 75, he ascended to Shamballa to be with the Lord of the World, Sanat Kumara.

== Controversy regarding incarnation as Apollonius of Tyana ==
Helena Blavatsky, a founder of the Theosophical Society, wrote in 1877: "Apollonius, a contemporary of Jesus of Nazareth, was, like him, an enthusiastic founder of a new spiritual school. Perhaps less metaphysical and more practical than Jesus, less tender and perfect in his nature, he nevertheless inculcated the same quintessence of spirituality, and the same high moral truths." Some Theosophists such as C.W. Leadbeater and the teachers of Neo-Theosophy, Alice A. Bailey and Benjamin Creme, have written that the Master Jesus was also incarnated as Apollonius of Tyana after his incarnation as Jesus of Nazareth. It is believed that he attained the fifth level of initiation (the resurrection) when he became an Ascended Master at the end of his life as Apollonius of Tyana. However, if Apollonius was a contemporary of Jesus as Blavatsky wrote, Jesus could not have reincarnated as him. Benjamin Creme gets around this by claiming that Jesus lived from 24 BC to AD 9 (instead of the usual dates given of Jesus' lifetime as being c. 6 BC to c. AD 30 or AD 33). This means that Jesus could have incarnated as Apollonius of Tyana, since according to Creme, Apollonius lived from AD 16 to c. AD 97. However, one of the possible chronologies of Apollonius of Tyana's life sometimes cited give his life span as being from AD 40 to AD 120, thus making it possible that, even if the usual dates of Jesus' lifetime are accepted (c. 6 BC to c. AD 30 or AD 33), he still could have incarnated as Apollonius of Tyana. However, other modern scholarship, more often cited, gives the dates of Appolonius' life span as c. AD 15 to c. AD 100, thus making it problematic, realistically speaking, that Jesus could have incarnated as him.

Jesus' incarnation as Apollonius of Tyana is accepted by the followers of traditional Theosophy, of Alice A. Bailey, and of Benjamin Creme, but not by those who are adherent to the Ascended Master Teachings, who believe that the incarnation as Jesus was his last embodiment on Earth.

== Incarnation as Ramanuja ==
C.W. Leadbeater stated that the Master Jesus, after his resurrection in the body of Apollonius of Tyana, incarnated in India as the Tamil religious reformer Ramanuja, a leading figure within the Bhakti movement in Hinduism; thus, by incarnating as Ramanuja, Jesus became an Avatar. According to Leadbeater, the Master Jesus incarnated as Ramanuja as part of his spiritual work as Master of the Sixth Ray of Love-Devotion (bhakti is the Sanskrit word for devotion).

That Jesus incarnated as Ramanuja is believed by many traditional Theosophists, but not by those adherent to the Ascended Master Teachings.

== Benjamin Creme's views ==
According to Benjamin Creme, the Master Jesus visited the Americas (as well as Polynesia) not immediately after his resurrection as recounted in the Book of Mormon, but in the late 7th century and early 8th century, after having descended to the continent of America from his dwelling place in Shamballah with Sanat Kumara. Like the Mormons, Creme believes that this visit gave rise to the legend of Quetzalcoatl.

Benjamin Crème asserted that, in the late 1970s, the Master Jesus appeared to Spencer W. Kimball, then president of the Church of Jesus Christ of Latter-day Saints, in the Washington D.C. Temple.

Creme stated that since 1990 the Master Jesus has been living in secret in Rome. After Maitreya makes his Emergence (the Day of Declaration), Creme asserted, the Master Jesus in his immortal body will assume the papal throne for the next 2,000 years of the Age of Aquarius.

== Master Jesus' retreat ==
According to the Ascended Master Teachings, the Master Jesus has a sumptuous retreat (residence on the etheric plane) above Jerusalem called the Resurrection Temple. Often his mother Mary (now married to the Archangel Raphael, as noted above, and serving the Solar Logos with him in the solar corona) descends to serve with him at the Resurrection Temple doing sacred rituals and answering prayers.

== Twin flame ==
Ascended Master Teachings groups describe the Master Jesus as having a twin flame (celestial spouse) named Lady Master Magda, one of whose two known incarnations was Mary Magdalene; the other was Aimee Semple McPherson.

== John the Beloved ==
According to the Ascended Master Teachings, the Ascended Master John the Beloved, who was Jesus’ best friend during his lifetime, has a retreat (residence on the etheric plane) above Arizona where he teaches a variety of white magic that involves the mastery of the elemental spirits governing the realms of earth, air, water, and fire. It is believed that the Master Jesus often teleports over to John the Beloved's retreat to say hello to his old friend.

== Aetherius Society ==
In the teachings of the Aetherius Society, headquartered in Hollywood, Los Angeles, California, it is promulgated that since his resurrection, the Master Jesus has been dwelling mostly on the higher planes of Venus in order to work with the Master Aetherius, but when his presence is required, he teleports to or takes a flying saucer to Earth as needed.

== Skeptical view ==
The scholar K. Paul Johnson maintains that the "Masters" that Madame Blavatsky wrote about and produced letters from were actually idealizations of people who were her mentors. In an article in The New York Times, Paul Zweig maintains that Madame Blavatsky's revelations were fraudulent.

However, the Master Jesus was never one of the "Masters" that Madame Blavatsky claimed to have met. He was added as a "Master" by Annie Besant and C.W. Leadbeater in their 1913 book Man: Whence, How and Whither.

== In popular culture ==
Comic books

- In the 1973 underground comic book titled Occult Laff-Parade, cartoonist Jay Kinney drew a comic strip in which the Master Jesus is portrayed as commanding a flying saucer fleet orbiting Earth looking for evil-doers. He is shown as being dressed in a military uniform with a crew cut and having the title Commander Jesus.
- The web comic Master Jesus, written by Len Kody and drawn by Steve Bialik, appeared beginning in 2010.

== See also ==
- Hodgson Report
- Vernon Harrison Report
