= Baird T. Spalding =

American spiritual writer

Baird T Spalding
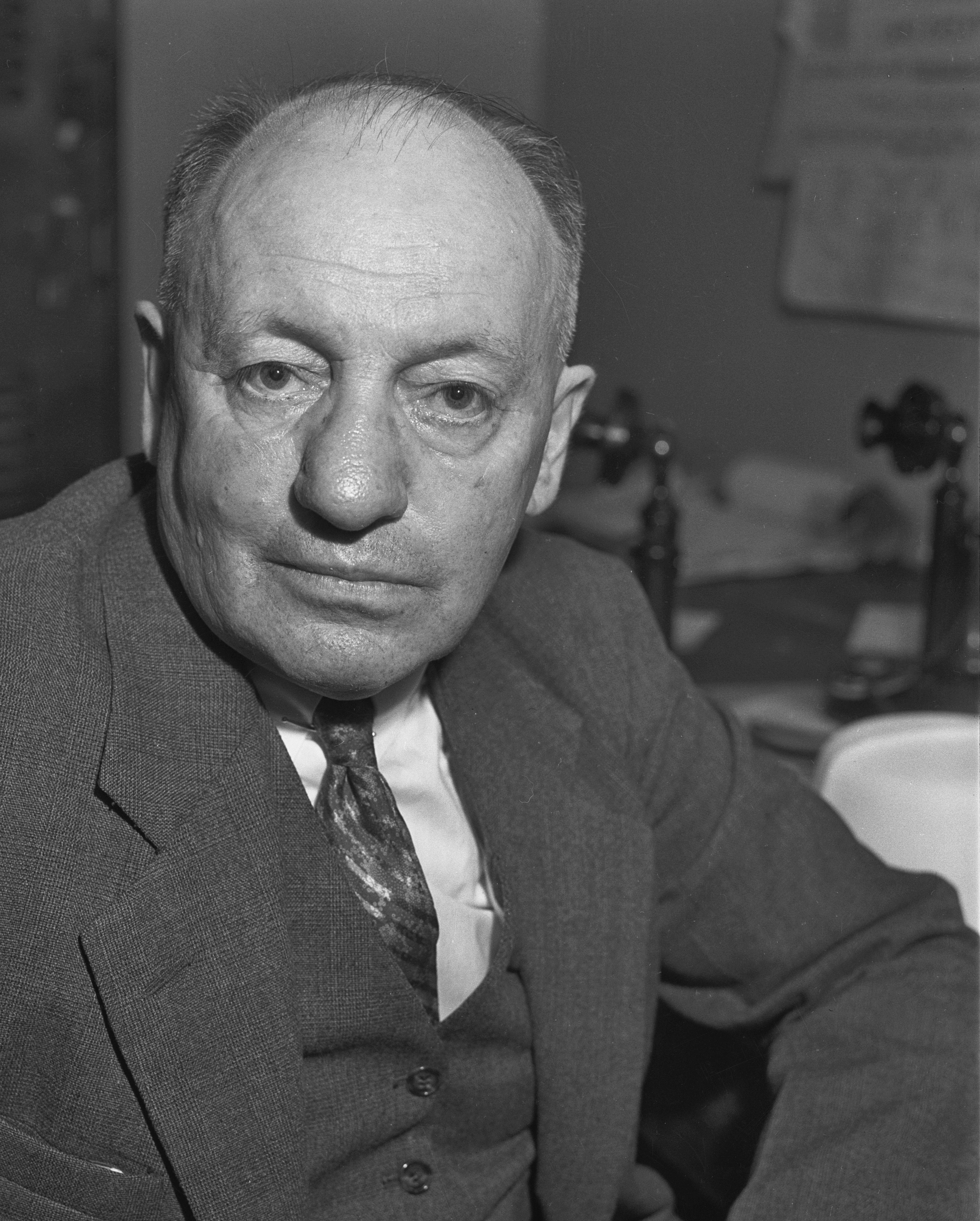
- Baird T. Spalding in 1935
- Born: October 3, 1872 Cohocton, New York, United States
- Died: March 18, 1953 (aged 80) Tempe, Arizona, US
- Occupation: Writer, miner
- Genre: Religion

Baird Thomas Spalding (1872–1953) was an American spiritual writer, author of the spiritual book series: Life and Teaching of the Masters of the Far East.

== Biography ==
Although Spalding's books claimed he was born in England in 1857, Spalding was also reported born in North Cohocton, New York in 1872. He spent much of his life as a mining engineer in the American West. Research on his life and the purported eleven person research expeditions to the Far East beginning in 1894 to study the "Masters" has turned up evidence and pictures that are included in later volumes of his book. Spalding visited the Far East first in the late 1800s and then again in the 1920s and then again in the 1935 trip to India at the bequest of his publisher, Devorss & Company. Anecdotal biographical detail was widely promulgated even during his lifetime. At his death in 1953 in Arizona, obituaries conflictingly cited his age as 95 or 107. His date of birth is given as "1872-1873" in the 1880 US census. However, that could mean that was the time he first came to the US as at that time it was common for foreigners to be given a new birth date and name when they first arrived in the US. The same date is given in a 1911 California marriage certificate. In other records, his place of birth is given as England with him emigrating to the US later.

Spalding did briefly visit India in 1935 as there is a US passport application dated 1935, and a Seattle immigration record on his return from India, dated 1936. A biography of Spalding, Baird T Spalding As I Knew Him was published by fellow mystic and DeVorss author David Bruton in 1954. About Spalding's claims regarding his birthplace, Bruton wrote:

On two different occasions I asked him where he was born. The first time he told me in 'upstate New York;' the second, 'Spalding, England.' During one of his last public lectures a member of the audience asked where he was born and he answered, 'In India.' He spoke with equal affection for the 'old family home' in upstate New York, in Spalding, England and in Cocanada, Madras Province, India.

== Works ==
In 1924, Spalding published the first volume of Life and Teaching of the Masters of the Far East. It describes the travels to India and Tibet of a research party of eleven scientists in 1894. During their trip they claim to have made contact with "the Great Masters of the Himalayas", immortal beings with whom they lived and studied, gaining insight into their lives and spiritual message. This close contact enabled them to witness many of the spiritual principles evinced by these Great Masters translated into their everyday lives, which Spalding describes as acts that can be accomplished by anyone who comes to know his "TRUE" self. Such examples are walking on water, or manifesting bread to feed the hungry party. Despite most of the action taking place in India, the Great Masters make it clear that the greatest embodiment of the Enlightened state is that of the Christ - the discovery of man's source of power within himself - that light of God - the Christ consciousness is that "Christ" state:

The Masters accept that Buddha represents the Way to Enlightenment, but they clearly set forth that the Christ Consciousness is Enlightenment, or a state of consciousness for which we are all seeking – the Christ light of every individual; therefore, the light of every child born into the world.

== Death and influence ==
Spalding published three additional volumes before his death in 1953. Volumes 5 and 6 were published by DeVorss & Co posthumously from various articles that Spalding had written.

Historian Mitch Horowitz has said that Spalding's "chronicles of occult revelation amount to canonical New-Age scripture." Spalding's books have remained in print since his death and his stories have helped to popularize the concept of Ascended Masters which became a common meme in New Age and alternative religious movements during the later twentieth century.

During the 1920s, Spalding was a personal acquaintance of Guy Ballard, also a mining engineer and founder of the I AM activity. Similar themes to Spalding can be seen in Ascended Master groups such as the Church Universal and Triumphant and the writings of Elizabeth Clare Prophet. Spalding is named as an influence in the writings of New Age figures such as JZ Knight, Paul Baumann of the Methernitha sect and Father Divine.

The growth of the New Age movement during the 1970s resulted in a renewal of interest in Spalding, and several New Age figures have claimed tenuous connections to him after his death. American mystic Thane of Hawaii, founder of the Prosperos group, claimed in 1974 to have ghost-written several of Spalding's later books and accompanied him on his 1935 India tour.

== Vietnam publication ==
There is a Vietnamese book, apparently first published in 1975, called Hành Trình Về Phương Đông by one Nguyên Phong. It purports to be the translation of a book written by Spalding in India in 1924. The book has gained some popularity in Vietnam, and an English translation was published in 2009, as Journey to the East. In the story, Spalding is joined in India by a group of prestigious mystics and academics, including Paul Brunton and Walter Evans-Wentz.
