= Seven rays =

Concept found in some religions and esoteric doctrines

The seven rays is a concept that Theosophists claim has appeared in several religions and esoteric philosophies in both Western culture and in India.

In various contemporary perennialist traditions it is claimed that the rays can be seen throughout occidental culture, such as in early Western mystery traditions, such as Gnosticism and Mithraism, and in texts and iconic art of the Catholic Church as early as the Byzantine Empire.

The seven rays concept was a novel perennialist reading of world religions and spirituality introduced in the teachings of Theosophy, first presented by Helena Blavatsky. The Theosophical concept of the seven rays was further developed in the late 19th and early 20th centuries in the writings of Theosophist Charles Webster Leadbeater, and by other authors such as Alice Bailey, Manly P. Hall, and others.

As the New Age movement of the mid-to-late 20th century developed, the seven rays concept appeared as an element of metaphysical healing methods, such as Reiki and other modalities, and in esoteric astrology.

== In Theosophy ==
Syncretism is one of the core principles of Theosophy, a religious philosophy originating with Helena Petrovna Blavatsky from the 1870s, and the seven rays appear repeatedly in the related writings. Theosophy holds that all religions are attempts by the "Spiritual Hierarchy" to help humanity in evolving to greater perfection, and that each religion therefore has a portion of the truth.

Blavatsky wrote in the first book of The Secret Doctrine of an "analogy between the Aryan or Brahmanical and the Egyptian esotericism" and that the "seven rays of the Chaldean Heptakis or Iao, on the Gnostic stones" represent the seven large stars of the Egyptian "Great Bear" constellation, the seven elemental powers, and the Hindu "seven Rishis." She stated that the seven rays of the Vedic sun deity Vishnu represent the same concept as the "astral fluid or 'Light' of the Kabalists," and that the seven emanations of the lower seven sephiroth are the "primeval seven rays," and "will be found and recognized in every religion."

In the second volume of The Secret Doctrine, Blavatsky discusses the "seven nervous plexuses of the body" and the seven rays they radiate, stating that this principle is found in the Rig Veda, in the mythology of Ahura Mazda, in the beliefs of the Incas, the Chinese Yao, and the Egyptian Osiris, who "when he enters the ark, or solar boat, takes seven Rays with him." She describes the "seven wise ones" of the Veda as "the seven Rays which fall free from the macrocosmic centre".

Blavatsky summarizes the syncretistic principle of her doctrine as it relates to the seven rays:

"...a key which reveals to us on indisputable grounds of comparative analogy... the Indian phœnix, the emblem of cyclic and periodical time, the "man-lion" Singha, of whose representations the so-called "gnostic gems" are so full. Over the seven rays of the lion's crown, and corresponding to their points, stand, in many cases, the seven vowels of the Greek alphabet AEHIOYW, testifying to the Seven Heavens. This is the Solar lion and the emblem of the Solar cycle, as Garuda is that of the great cycle, the "Maha-Kalpa" co-eternal with Vishnu, and also, of course, the emblem of the Sun, and Solar cycle. ... As well remarked by C. W. King: — "Whatever the primary meaning (of the gem with the solar lion and vowels) it was probably imported in its present shape from India, that true fountain head of gnostic iconography." (Gnostics, p. 218)

In the third volume of the Secret Doctrine, published posthumously, Blavatsky described the "Seven Primeval Rays" as a group of celestial beings also known as "Gods" or "Angels" or "Powers". She stated that this symbolism was "adopted later on by the Christian Religion as the 'Seven Angels of the Presence.'"

In Theosophy, the seven rays are said to be seven major types of Light-Substance (spirit/matter) (waves/particles) that compose the created universes. These are also believed to convey "Divine Qualities".

=== C.W. Leadbeater ===
C.W. Leadbeater gave a list showing the characteristic type of magic for each ray. This list indicates what he regarded as the most compatible type of magic to be performed by persons on each ray (although anyone of any ray can do any of these various types of magic).

- First ray: Magic of Will of magician
- Second ray: Magic of Raja Yoga (Development of Mind)
- Third ray: Magic of Astrology (Natural Magnetic Forces)
- Fourth ray: Magic of Hatha Yoga (physical development)
- Fifth ray: Magic of Alchemy (Manipulation of Material Substances)
- Sixth ray: Magic of Bhakti Yoga (Selfless Service and Altruistic Love; agape)
- Seventh ray: Ceremonial magic (Invocation of Elementals, and Devas)

== New Age teachings ==
According to Alice A. Bailey, each person has a soul ray that remains the same through all their incarnations, and a personality ray that is different for each incarnation. Each ray is also correspondent with certain Masters of Wisdom, and with particular planets, cycles, nations, etc. The seven rays are the basis for what Alice A. Bailey called New Age Psychology—she divides everyone in the human race into these seven psychological types.

Bailey stated that the seven rays that reach us on Earth locally originate within the "Solar Logos," i.e., the consciousness of the "Divine Being" of the Sun. According to Alice A. Bailey and Benjamin Creme, the seven rays are focused to the Solar Logos, through Sirius, the seven stars of the Big Dipper in the Great Bear, and the seven major stars of the Pleiades form the "Galactic Logos," (the consciousness of the "Divine Being" of the Milky Way Galaxy), and have their ultimate origin within the mind of God.

On the local planetary level, it is believed that the seven rays are transmitted from the Solar Logos through the God of our planet, Sanat Kumara, then through the spiritual hierarchy of our planet which includes the "Masters of Wisdom" (Some writings term them the Ascended Masters or the Great White Brotherhood).

Each of the seven rays is believed to be associated with a different kind of occult energy, and a different color.

=== Qualities of the seven rays ===
The seven rays are listed below:

Alice A. Bailey and the Church Universal and Triumphant assign different colors and in some cases different Masters to each of the seven rays. In Letters on Occult Meditation, Alice Bailey indicates that there is no simple correspondence between the rays and these colors. The colors, Masters, and Retreats indicated here are those indicated by both Alice Bailey and the Church Universal and Triumphant.

According to Alice A. Bailey the Masters live in immortal bodies at a residence on the physical plane at the indicated location (although a given Master may physically travel extensively incognito to various locations, become invisible, teleport to various locations, and walk through walls, as well as influence humans telepathically and travel on the inner planes, as required by the demands of his spiritual work).

According to the Church Universal and Triumphant and other ascended master teachings, each Master is believed to serve at a Retreat on the physical or etheric plane at the geographical location shown after their name.

The "Gifts of the Holy Spirit" of the Church Universal and Triumphant for each ray are shown. For both Alice A. Bailey and the Church Universal and Triumphant, each ray has a jewel which is believed to focus the energy of that ray, which is indicated.

==== Alice A. Bailey ====
Ray	Concept	"Expression"	Colours	Astrological planets	Astrological signs	Wisdom Masters
First	"Will or Power"	"The basic Reservoir of Power"	Red	Vulcan and Pluto	Taurus and Pisces	Manu, Morya
Second	"Love-wisdom"	"Magnetism"	Blue	Sun and Jupiter	Leo and Virgo	Christ, Koot Humi, and Djwhal Khul
Third	"Adaptability" or "Active Intelligence"	"Instinct"	Green	Earth and Saturn	Gemini and Libra	Mahachohan
Fourth	Beauty or Harmony or "Harmony through Conflict"	"Uniformity of Colour" or "Experience. Growth."	Yellow	Mercury and Moon	Scorpio and Aquarius	Serapis
Fifth	Concrete Knowledge or Science	"Intellect"	Orange	Venus	Capricorn	Master Hilarion, Paul of Tarsus (158)
Sixth	"Devotion" or "Abstract Idealism"	"Intellect"	Violet	Neptune and Mars	Cancer and Sagittarius	Master Jesus
Seventh	"Organisation and Ritual" or "Ceremonial organization" or "Ceremonial Magic or Order"	"Radioactivity"	Indigo	Uranus	Aries	Master Rakoczi

==== The Summit Lighthouse ====
Lords of the "Seven Rays" according to Ascended master teachings:

	Ray	Colour	Wisdom Master	Retreat	Quality	Chakra	Day	Gift of the Holy Spirit	Jewel
1st ray	Power of God	Blue Cyan	Master El Morya	Darjeeling, India	Strength Balance Will	Throat (5th)	Tuesday	Faith in God's will Protection	Diamond Sapphire Star Sapphire Lapis Lazuli
2nd ray	Wisdom of God	Yellow Gold	Kuthumi	Grand Teton, Wyoming, United States	Wisdom Understanding Illumination	Crown (7th)	Sunday	Intelligence Knowledge	Yellow Diamond Yellow Sapphire Topaz
3rd ray	Love of God	Pink Rose	Paul the Venetian	Château de Liberté, S. France Temple of the Sun, New York	Goodness Compromise Beauty	Heart (4th)	Monday	Discerning of spirits Creativity	Ruby Diamond Garnet Rose quartz Pink Beryl
4th ray	Purity of God	White Crystal	Serapis Bey	Luxor, Egypt	Purity Resurrection Joy	Base of the Spine (1st)	Friday	Working of miracles	Diamond Pearl Zircon Quartz crystal
5th ray	Truth of God	Green Gold	Hilarion	Crete, Greece	Health Consecration Focus	Third Eye (6th)	Wednesday	Healing	Emerald Diamond Jade Quartz crystal
6th ray	Peace of God	Purple Gold Ruby	Lady Master Nada	Arabian Peninsula	Peace Service Brotherhood	Solar Plexus (3rd)	Thursday	Diverse kinds of tongues and interpretation	Ruby Topaz Alexandrite Diamond with pearl
7th ray	Freedom of God	Violet Amethyst	Saint Germain	Transylvania, Romania Table Mountain, Wyoming, United States	Freedom Mercy Compassion	Seat of the Soul (2nd)	Saturday	Prophecy Working of Miracles	Amethyst Diamond Aquamarine

In the mid-to-late 20th century, as the New Age movement gained in popularity, the concept and imagery of the seven rays appeared in a variety of settings.

In esoteric astrology, the seven rays are considered to be split into three groups: the first two rays represent Will and Wisdom, respectively, and the remaining five rays together form the group that represents Activity. In a style of Reiki adapted by Carolyn E. Jackson the student passes through a sequence of levels by mastering the "key" to each level. The key for the second level is known as the key of "oneness" and is attained by passing through each of the seven rays. This, however, is not part of traditional Reiki or other versions of the Reiki system.

According to psychic counselor Samantha Stevens, an individual can use affirmations, candles, color therapy, vibrational medicines and other methods to contact "archangels," which she defines as the "seven rays," based on Buddhist and Christian theories: "The Rays or Divine Flames (as they are sometimes called) represent elements in the perfectly integrated human being - one whose heart is aligned with their will and inspired by the Divine Imagination."

Light therapist and Radionics Practitioner Primrose Cooper writes that in using light as a healing modality, she finds it helpful to use the seven rays as defined in Theosophy to assist her clients in finding "psychological insight into their soul's purpose."

In recent years, there was the creation of a secretive group named "The Keepers of the Seven Rays". Their philosophy is the human being has seven emanations in which it finds itself, or connects with the Higher Self. These emanations are extensions of the Higher Self or otherwise called the Higher Will. These emanations reach out like arms and grasp onto the knowledge(of all types) needed for the full development of the individual into his/her Higher Potential. All a human has to do to use these emanations is to know basic moral law, what their body and/or psyche can and cannot handle, and listen.

Metaphysical philosopher George Gurdjieff wrote frequently of his "Seven Rays of Creation". According to Gurdjieff, the Seven Rays of Creation are the seven manifestations of Energy in our Universe. The first Ray contains all things (the entire universe) and all things obey the laws inherent in the First Ray. The First Ray then manifests itself in the 2nd Realm, the realm of Galaxies. From Galaxies to Solar Systems, Solar Systems to Planets. From Planets to Organisms on the planets, etc.

== In Catholicism ==
The Annunciation Jan van Eyck, 1434 Seven rays of light descend from the upper window

In early Christian iconography, the dove of the Holy Ghost is often shown with an emanation of seven rays, as is the image of the Madonna, often in conjunction with a dove or doves. The Monastery of St. Catherine on Mount Sinai, circa 565, shows the Transfiguration of Christ in the apse mosaic, with "seven rays of light shining from the luminous body of Christ over the apostles Peter, James and John." In the present-day Byzantine-style St. Louis Cathedral in Missouri, the center of the sanctuary has an engraved circle with many symbols of the Holy Trinity. The inscription reads: "Radiating from this symbol are seven rays of light representing the seven gifts of the Holy Ghost."

During the 12th century, Saint Norbert of Xanten, founder of the Order of Canons Regular of Prémontré, discovered the spot where the relics of Saint Ursula and her companions of Saint Gereon and of other martyrs lay hidden while in a dream. In the dream that led him to this location, he was guided by "the seven rays of light ... surrounding the head of the crucified Redeemer."

The Annunciation is an oil painting by Early Netherlandish master Jan van Eyck, from around 1434 to 1436. The picture depicts the Annunciation by the Archangel Gabriel to the Virgin Mary that she will bear the Son of God (Luke 1:26-38). In a prominent element of the complex iconographic work, the Seven gifts of the Holy Spirit descend to her on seven rays of light from the upper window to the left, with the dove symbolising the Holy Spirit following the same path. The seven rays on which the doves descend are unique elements in the painting in that they are of the heavenly realm rather than the earthly realm, with the difference shown by the artist through the use of gold leaf rather than ordinary oil paint. Only the seven rays are so treated, and — while all of the other light sources in the painting cast shadows — the seven rays do not.

The Italian secret society of the late 17th century, Knights of the Apocalypse, was founded with the professed aim to defend the Catholic Church against the expected Antichrist, though it was accused of having political motives as well. They wore on their breasts a star with seven rays.

== In Hindu scripture ==
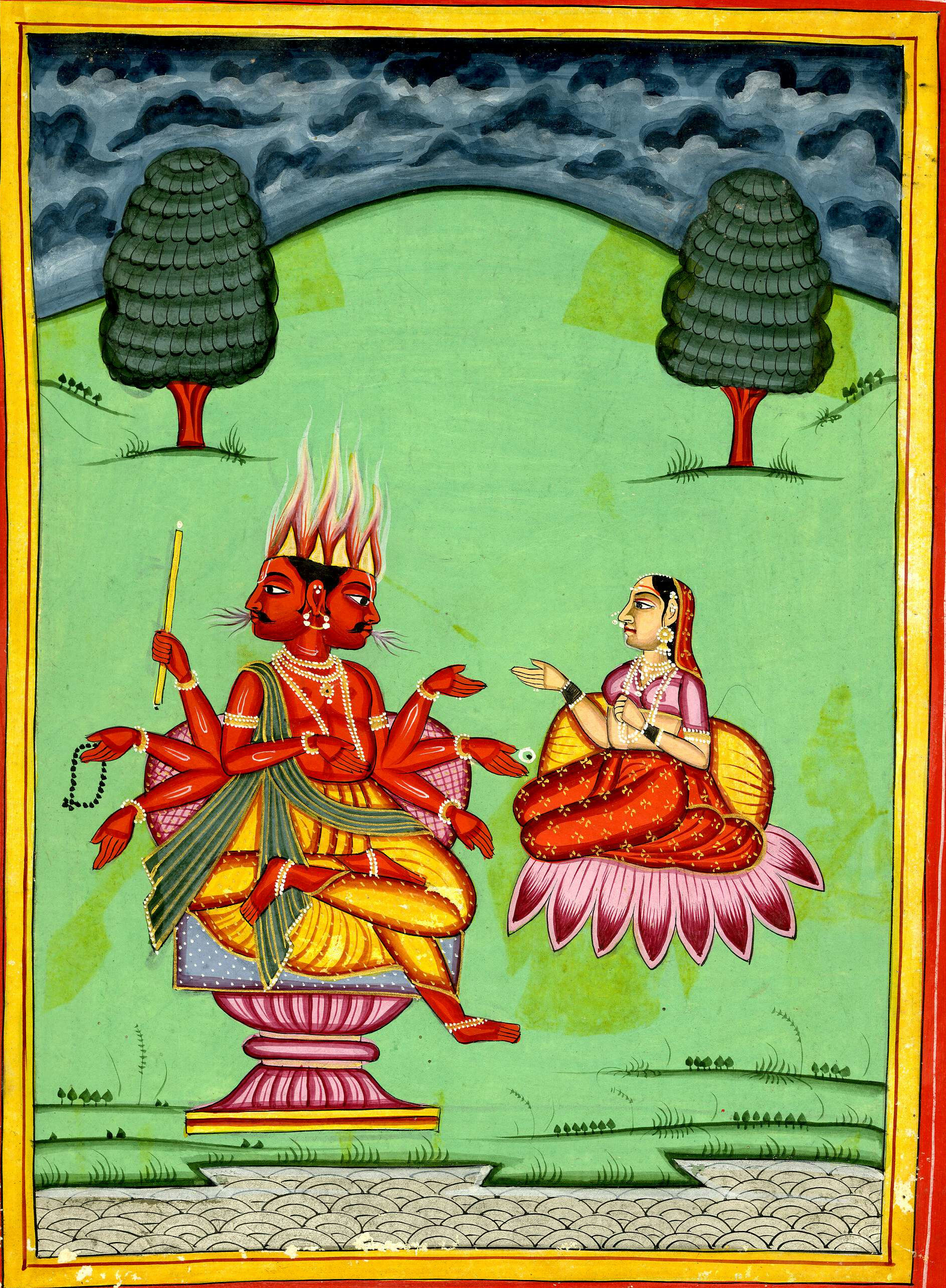
The seven-armed Agni with his wife.

Agni is a Hindu and Vedic deity depicted in three forms: fire, lightning and the sun. In Hindu art, Agni is depicted with two or seven hands, two heads and three legs. On each head, he has seven fiery tongues, with which he licks sacrificial butter. He rides a ram or a chariot harnessed by fiery horses. His attributes are an axe, a torch, prayer beads and a flaming spear. Agni is represented as red and two-faced, suggesting both his destructive and his beneficent qualities, and with black eyes and hair. Seven rays of light emanate from his body.

The Vishnu Purana, a post-Vedic scripture, describes how Vishnu "enters into the seven solar rays which dilate into seven suns." These are the "seven principal solar rays," the source of heat even to the planet Jupiter, and the "seven suns into which the seven solar rays dilate at the consummation of all things...."

The 20th-century Hindu scholar, poet and mystic Sri Aurobindo described the Vedic seven rays of knowledge, or Agni, as "the seven forms of the Thought-principle" and wrote that "the seven brilliant horses of the sun and their full union constitutes the seven-headed Thought of Ayasya by which the lost sun of Truth is recovered. That thought is again established in the seven rivers, the seven principles of being divine and human, the totality of which founds the perfect spiritual existence."

== Syncretistic interpretations ==
Spiritualist Gerald Massey wrote in 1881 of what he described as connections between Vedic scripture, ancient Egyptian mythology and the Gospel stories. He theorized that the Archon Iao, the "Seven-rayed Sun-God of the Gnostic-stones" was also the "Serpent Chnubis," and "the Second Beast in the Book of Revelation." In 1900, he elaborated further, describing the unity of "the seven souls of the Pharaoh," "the seven arms of the Hindu god Agni," "the seven stars in the hand of the Christ in Revelation," and "the seven rays of the Chaldean god Heptaktis, or Iao, on the Gnostic stones."

Samuel Fales Dunlap, wrote in 1894:

Moses was of the race of the Chaldeans. The Chaldean Mithra had his Seven Rays, and Moses his Seven Days. The other planets which circling around the sun lead the dance as round the King of heaven receive from him with the light also their powers; while as the light comes to them from the sun so from him they receive their powers that he pours out into the Seven Spheres of the Seven Planets of which the sun is the centre.

Dunlap wrote that the idea of spirit as the ultimate cause is present in all of the great religions of the East (which in the terminology of his time included the area now known as the Near East or Middle East), and that this idea can be found in "the Seven Rays of the Chaldaean Mithra and the Seven Days of Genesis. From the Sun came fire and spirit." According to Dunlap, "this was the astronomical religion of the Chaldeans, Jews, Persians, Syrians, Phoenicians and Egyptians."

Dunlap compared the nimbus of Apollo to the seven rays of Dionysus, presiding over the orbits of the seven planets. The seven rays are found also in the Chaldean mystery of "the God of the Seven Rays, who held the Seven Stars in his hand, through whom (as Chaldaeans supposed) the souls were raised." Prior to the Christian era, this deity was known as Iao (the first birth) or Sabaoth (the Sun), and later described as "Christos of the Resurrection of Souls."

In the late 1940s, art historian and writer Ananda Coomaraswamy was curator in the department of Asiatic Art at the Boston Museum of Fine Arts and built the first large collection of Indian art in the United States. His writings in the field of perennial philosophy and the Traditionalist School included complex essays collating symbols of ancient wisdom and metaphysics from widely diverse cultures including Indian, Islamic, Chinese, Hellenic, and Christian sources. He wrote that the seven rays of the sun appear in both Hindu and Christian symbolism, representing similar concepts, and in particular the symbolism of the seventh ray that "corresponds to the distinction of transcendent from immanent and of infinite from finite". He added that of "our Axis of the Universe (skambha, divo dharuna, etc.) and Islamic Qutb", the seventh ray alone passes through the Sun to the suprasolar Brahma worlds, "where no sun shines" ("all that is under the Sun being in the power of Death, and all beyond immortal").

== In popular culture ==
Music

- The progressive rock band Utopia performed a song entitled The Seven Rays. The song was written by bassist, John Siegler and band leader, Todd Rundgren.
- Another progressive rock band, Hawkwind, have a song about the seven rays titled Seven by Seven.
- Mike Pinder of The Moody Blues refers heavily to the "seven rays" and the "Light of Seven" in his solo album "The Promise".
- The pop band Erasure refers to the Violet Flame through the title of their 2014 album, The Violet Flame.

Literature

- S.M. Stirling's fictionalized and changed Church Universal and Triumphant believes that the "Light of the Seven Rays" has become stronger since The Change. The Sword of the Lady mentions the Fourth Ray.
