= Paul Baumann =

Paul Baumann may refer to:

- Paul Baumann (accountant)
- Paul Baumann (journalist)
- Methernitha, a religious group founded by Paul Baumann
