= Saint Germain Foundation =

U.S. based religious organization

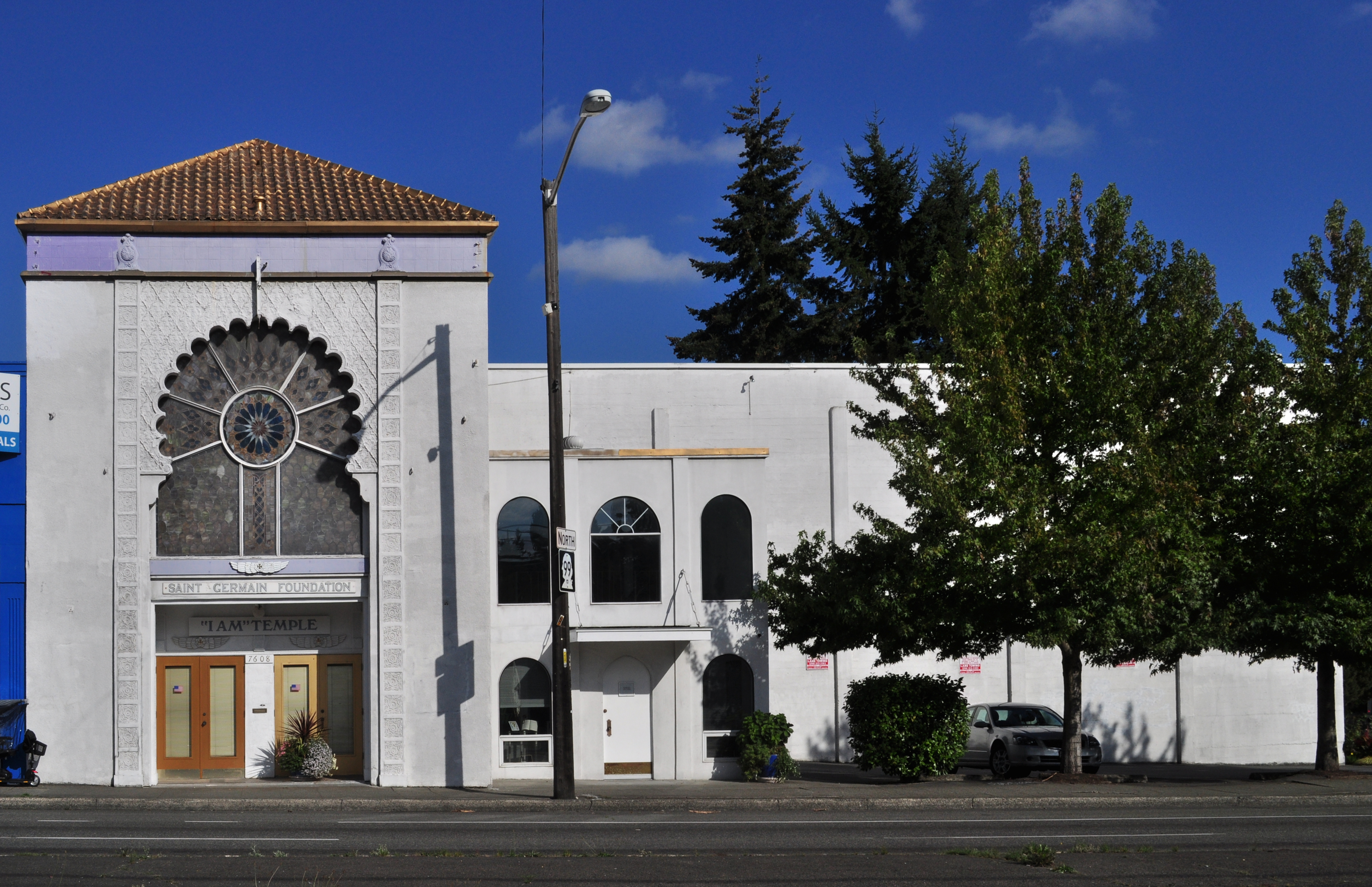
Saint Germain Foundation "I Am" Temple, Seattle, Washington. The building is a former cinema on Aurora Avenue North.

The Saint Germain Movement is an American religious movement, headquartered in Schaumburg, Illinois, a suburb of Chicago, with a major facility just north of Dunsmuir, California, in the buildings and property of the Shasta Springs retreat. There is also a facility in the Capitol Hill neighborhood in downtown Denver, Colorado.

The organization's doctrines are based on teachings and wisdom received by Guy Ballard in 1930. Ballard was hiking on the slopes of Mount Shasta in California, and claimed that Saint Germain appeared to him and began training him to be a "Messenger". Ballard published his experiences in a series of books. The organization's philosophies are known as the "I AM" Activity, and its members popularly known as "I AM" students.

There are hundreds of "I AM" temples and sanctuaries located in most principal cities of the United States, Canada, Western Europe, Australia and locations in India, Latin America and Africa where members come together every week to decree for the benefit of mankind. There are also group meetings on various continents, as well as introductory classes and musicals. The Saint Germain Foundation and Press serves "I AM" students all over the world and performs pageants for residents and visitors alike in Mt. Shasta: "For more than 70 years, the 'I AM' COME! Pageant, on the Life of Jesus the Christ, has been given annually in the outdoor G. W. Ballard Amphitheater, with magnificent Mt. Shasta (California) as a backdrop."

J. Gordon Melton, an American religious scholar, studied the group and ranked it in the category "established cult". Also present in New Zealand, the St. Germain Foundation is considered by the writer Robert S. Ellwood as a religious group with theosophical and esoteric roots. It is recognized by the Theosophical Society and the Great White Brotherhood.

The group founded a community in France in 1956 that is located in the Alpes-de-Haute-Provence. It counts less than 50 members.

The group refuses to grant hikers access to Mossbrae Falls near its land in Dunsmuir.

Worldwide, the religious group had over one million members in 1940, but it began to decline after Ballard's death. Among its splinter groups have been The Bridge to Freedom, The Summit Lighthouse, and the Church Universal and Triumphant.

== See also ==
- Edna Anne Wheeler Ballard – co-founder
