= Mark L. Prophet =

American New Age religious figure, self-proclaimed prophet and orator (1918–1973)

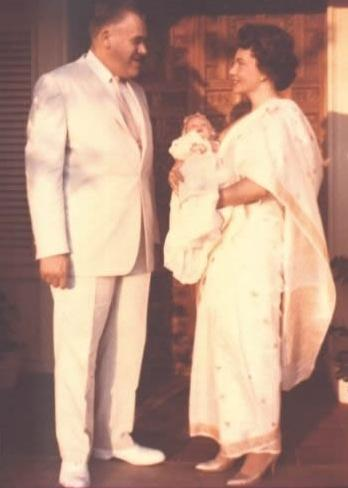
Mark L. Prophet (left) and Elizabeth Prophet (right)

Marcus Lyle "Mark" Prophet (December 24, 1918 — February 26, 1973) was a controversial American New Age religious figure, self-proclaimed prophet, orator, and husband of Elizabeth Prophet. He claimed to be a Messenger of the Ascended Masters and founded The Summit Lighthouse organization on August 7, 1958 in Washington D.C.

== Personal life ==
Marcus Lyle "Mark" Prophet was born on December 24, 1918, in Chippewa Falls, Wisconsin. With his wife Phyllis Margaret Lee he had five children. In 1960, he met Elizabeth Clare Prophet (born Wulf), whom he married in 1962 after divorcing his first wife. Mark and Elizabeth Prophet had four children.

== Death ==
Prophet died of a stroke on February 26, 1973, in Colorado Springs, Colorado at age 54. Upon his death, his widow Elizabeth took over the leadership of the organization, changing its name to Church Universal and Triumphant in 1975, and built the new church into an ongoing worldwide movement.

== Transition to an Ascended Master ==
Upon his death, Elizabeth Prophet taught that he became an Ascended Master known as the Ascended Master Lanello (the name comes from the combination of two of the names of his many asserted former incarnations, Sir Launcelot and Henry Wadsworth Longfellow).

Adherents to the Church Universal and Triumphant and other Ascended Master Teachings believe that the Master Lanello was previously incarnated as a high priest at the Temple of the Solar Logos in Atlantis; Noah; Ikhnaton; Aesop; Mark the Evangelist; Origen; Sir Launcelot; Bodhidharma, founder of Zen Buddhism; Clovis I, first king of France; Saladin; St. Bonaventure; Louis XIV; Henry Wadsworth Longfellow; and Alexei Nikolaevich, Tsarevich of Russia.

== Works ==
- The Masters and Their Retreats (by Mark L. Prophet, Elizabeth Clare Prophet, Booth Annice (Editor)
- Lords of the Seven Rays: Seven Masters: Their Past Lives and Keys to Our Future (by Mark L. Prophet and Elizabeth Clare Prophet)
- Saint Germain on Alchemy (by Mark L. Prophet and Elizabeth Clare Prophet)
