= The Bridge to Freedom =

Ascended Master Teachings religion

The Bridge to Freedom, an Ascended Master Teachings religion, was established in 1951 by Geraldine Innocente and other students of the Ascended Masters after she received what was believed to be an "anointing" to become a "messenger" for the Great White Brotherhood. This organization believed that their teachings had been given to humanity by the Ascended Masters. These were believed to be individuals who had lived in physical bodies, acquired the wisdom and mastery needed to become immortal and free of the cycles of "re-embodiment" and karma, attaining in this way their "Ascension". They considered the "ascension" to be the complete, permanent union of the purified outer self with the "I AM" Presence—meaning that true identity that is the unique individualization of God for each person.

== Beliefs ==
The members of The Bridge to Freedom claim that a Dispensation and Sponsorship was given by the Ascended Masters for this Ascended Master Activity to be an outer organization representing the "Great Brotherhood of Light", and a continuation of previous efforts by the Ascended Masters to bring Illumination to mankind through Theosophy, Agni Yoga, and the "I AM" Activity.

The members of The Bridge to Freedom believe that Ascended Master El Morya contacted Geraldine Innocente in 1944 and asked her to make a certain application on a daily basis. The story is told that Morya returned one year later asking if she would consent to receive a series of Discourses from the Maha Chohan. Geraldine is said to have agreed, and she then underwent years of training in preparation for her role in the 1950s as a Messenger for the Ascended Masters, the Archangels, Cosmic Beings, the Elohim, and Others of the Spiritual Hierarchy. She served officially in the capacity of Messenger beginning with the inaugural Vesta Dictation on July 17, 1951, until her transition on June 21, 1961.

The Bridge to Freedom claims that in 1952 the Ascended Master Saint Germain stated that:

" . . . It was never intended to start a 'new' Activity, but to broaden the field of service of the present Activity, by engaging the competent and willing service of lifestreams not presently allowed full expression of their talents in 'widening the borders of the Father's Kingdom.' Many hundreds of thousands of souls have not been privileged to receive the Instruction brought forth in My Name, due to barriers of language, limitation in the production and distribution of illuminating literature and the unhappy 'excommunications' which resulted from misunderstanding of a human nature. . . . A way and means by which We might reach the consciousness of the people had to be devised. 'The Bridge' was the solution to this problem. Mrs. Ballard was informed prior to any other individual of the purpose for which The Bridge came forth and was courteously invited to allow Us the opportunity of supporting her work and performing through other well qualified individuals the task of reaching other lifestreams than those presently blessed by the knowledge of The "I AM" Activity. . . . The Sun cannot limit its shining to one beam, nor the Love of God to one human consciousness, no matter how well attuned it may have been to the Vibrations of the Masters. The souls of men are our concern, all men, of all colors, all countries, because from the Flame in their hearts will come the Illumination which will make this Dark Star a Flaming Sun of Freedom. . . . "

== Purpose ==
It is believed that in September 1952, the Master Morya explained (through Geraldine Innocente) the purpose of the founding of The Bridge to Freedom:

" . . . The beloved Maha Chohan gave Me a limited Grant, saying that the response of the few whom I had chosen would determine whether I could continue such an association. With well justified trepidation, I endeavored to correspond with the most likely and promising of those who professed to love Us and Our Way. Their response made it possible for Me to continue this Endeavor. Now many good and fine lifestreams, like a golden chain, girdling the Earth, make it possible for Us to transmit the current Action of the Brothers around the planet and bless all life and stimulate all souls by this universal service. This is the purpose of The Bridge, The Bulletin, and this expanded service which is but a part of the one Plan, even as the foundation is laid and a beautiful Spiritual Edifice built thereon. Without the Hierarchy, the Earth would long ago have passed into oblivion, the electrons which compose it returned to the universe, and the souls depending upon it for existence snuffed out like candles before the wind. . . . "

== See also ==
- "I AM" Activity
