= Knights of the Apocalypse =

Secret society created in Italy in 1693

The Knights of the Apocalypse was a secret society created in Italy in 1693. It was founded by Agostino Gabrino, the son of a merchant of Brescia to defend the Catholic Church against the expected Antichrist. The organization was accused by contemporaries of having political motives.

Gabrino was responsible for two notable disruptions of church ceremonies in 1693. One occurred on Palm Sunday 1693, when Gabrino rushed the altar of St Peter's at Rome with a sword. He yelled Ego sum Rex Gloriae ("I am king of glory") as he attacked the altar, a response to the choir's chants of Quis est iste Rex Gloriae? ("Who was that king of Glory?"). He also disturbed public worship at the Church of the Holy Savior. Though Gabrino was treated as a madman and confined in a madhouse, the society flourished until one member, a woodcutter, denounced it to the Inquisition, leading to the arrest of eighty knights.

Though chiefly mechanics, tradesmen and labourers, members always carried their swords, even when at work. They also wore a star on their breasts with seven rays, a tail, and surrounded by a golden thread forming a circle representing the globe. The tail of the star represented the sword seen by St. John in the Apocalypse. Gabrino styled himself monarch of the Holy Trinity. He was credited by his enemies with a desire to introduce polygamy and has been accused of an intended rebellion against the papal government. His knights were instructed to only marry pure virgins.

== See also ==
- Secret society
