= Ascended master =

Spiritually enlightened beings in Theosophy

Ascended masters, also known as Mahatmas, are believed in several theosophical and related spiritual traditions to be spiritually enlightened beings who in past incarnations were ordinary humans. Through a series of spiritual transformations, or initiations, they are said to have achieved a higher state of being.

Although the terms mahatma and ascended master are often used synonymously, the Ascended Master Teachings define them differently, associating "ascended master" with a higher level of spiritual attainment, specifically the Sixth Initiation or Ascension. This contrasts with "Masters of Light", "Healers", or "Spiritual Masters", who are said to have taken the Fifth Initiation and reside in a fifth dimension.

The term ascended master was first used by Baird T. Spalding in 1924 in his series of books Life and Teachings of the Masters of the Far East (DeVorss and Co.). Godfre Ray King (Guy Ballard) further popularized this concept of spiritual masters who had once lived on the earth in his book Unveiled Mysteries:

"I had heard of the Great Ascended Masters who could take their bodies with them wherever they go and manifest or bring into visibility anything they desire to use direct from the Universal."

== Definition ==
Adherents of the ascended master Teachings hold that the beliefs surrounding ascended masters were partially released by the Theosophical Society beginning in 1875, by C.W. Leadbeater and Alice A. Bailey, and began to have more detailed public release in the 1930s by the ascended masters through Guy Ballard in the I AM Activity. However, theosophists maintain that the concept of an ascended master is an exaggeration and corruption of the more modest theosophical concept of "Master of the Ancient Wisdom".

Guy Ballard said his work Unveiled Mysteries was dictated to him by the ascended master Saint Germain. Other Ascended Master Teachings are contained in The Bridge to Freedom (1951), Mark Prophet and Elizabeth Clare Prophet's The Summit Lighthouse (1958) (reorganized as the Church Universal and Triumphant in 1975), The Temple of The Presence (1995), The Hearts Center (2005), the I AM University (2004), and various other organizations such as The White Eagle Lodge (1936) and the Aquarian Christine Church Universal (2006).

Peter Mt. Shasta, who claimed to have met the ascended masters Saint Germain, Kuthumi, and El Morya, has been releasing the ancient teachings in a more modern and simplified form, emphasizing the teaching that the masters can work with those who have an open heart and the desire to benefit humanity.

== Beliefs about ascended masters ==
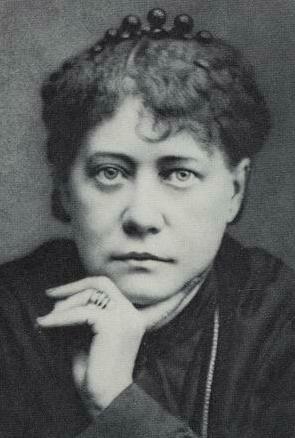
Helena P. Blavatsky in 1877.

The term ascended master was first introduced in 1934 by Guy Ballard with the publication of Unveiled Mysteries, a book which he said was dictated to him by the ascended master St. Germain. Other Ascended Master Teachings are contained in The Bridge to Freedom (1951), The Summit Lighthouse (1958) (known also as The Church Universal and Triumphant), The Aetherius Society (1955), The Temple of The Presence (1995), the I AM University (2004), the White Eagle Lodge (1936) and the Aquarian Christine Church Universal, Inc. (2006).

In Ascended Master Teachings there is also mention of Serapis Bey, a being who was incarnated as a high priest in one of the "Temples of the Sacred Fire" on Atlantis, and who migrated to Egypt at the time of the destruction of Atlantis. It is also believed that he was incarnated as the Egyptian Pharaoh Amenhotep III (who constructed the Temple of Luxor to the god Amon) and also as Leonidas, the King of Sparta, who was killed in 480 BC defending the pass of Thermopylae against the invasion of ancient Greece by Emperor Xerxes I of the Persian Empire.

== Other beliefs about ascended masters ==
Belief in the ascended masters and their Great White Brotherhood is an essential part of the beliefs of various organizations that have continued and expanded the concepts released in the original Saint Germain instruction in the 1930s through the "I AM" Activity. Examples of those believed by the ones proposing these teachings to be ascended masters would be the Master Jesus, Confucius, Gautama Buddha, Mary the mother of Jesus, St. Paul of Tarsus (a.k.a. Hilarion), Ashtar Sheran, Sanat Kumara, Melchizedek, Archangel Michael, Metatron, Kwan Yin, the Count of St. Germain and Kuthumi.

== Jesus ==
Jesus is believed to be one of the Masters of the Ancient Wisdom in Theosophy and is one of the ascended masters in the Ascended Master Teachings. The Master Jesus is regarded by Theosophists as the Master of the Sixth Ray.

It is believed by Ascended Master Teachings organizations that the Master Jesus was "Chohan of the Sixth Ray" until December 31, 1959, when, according to Elizabeth Clare Prophet, Lady Master Nada fully took on the Office in the Spiritual Hierarchy in his place. According to Prophet, Jesus became World Teacher, along with Kuthumi on January 1, 1956, succeeding Maitreya, who took the Office of "Planetary Buddha" and "Cosmic Christ".

According to Elizabeth Clare Prophet, Prophet of the Church Universal and Triumphant (the largest Ascended Master Teachings religion), the Master Jesus incarnated twice as the Emperor of Atlantis, once in 33,050 BC and again in 15,000 BC.

According to Alice Bailey, the Master Jesus was previously incarnated as Joshua, the Hebrew military leader in the 13th century BC, and Joshua the High Priest in the sixth century BC.

According to the Ascended Master Teachings, Jesus was also incarnated as Joseph of the coat of many colors in the 17th century BC/16th century BC (approximately between 1650 BC and 1550 BC), as well as King David (who lived c. 1037 BC until around 970 BC), and Elisha in the 9th century BC.

== Sanat Kumara ==
According to the post-1900 publications of Theosophy (specifically, the writings of Charles W. Leadbeater, Alice Bailey, and Benjamin Creme, as well as the Ascended Master Teachings of Guy Ballard, Elizabeth Clare Prophet, Geraldine Innocente, Joshua David Stone, and other Ascended Master Teachings teachers), Sanat Kumara is an "advanced being" of the Ninth Initiation (the highest initiation possible on planet Earth) who is regarded as the Lord or Regent of Earth and of humanity, and the head of the Spiritual Hierarchy of Earth who dwells in Shamballah.

It is believed by these authors that he is the founder of the Great White Brotherhood, which consists of Masters of the Ancient Wisdom (Fifth Initiation), ascended masters (Sixth Initiation), Chohans and Bodhisattvas (Seventh Initiation), Buddhas (Eighth Initiation), and highly spiritually-evolved volunteers from other worlds, who have all joined to advance spiritual evolution on Earth.

Sanat Kumara was mentioned briefly by the theosophist Helena Blavatsky. She claimed he belonged to a group of beings, the "Lords of the Flame", whom Christian tradition have misunderstood as Lucifer and the fallen angels.

Sanat Kumara gained greater prominence when her follower Charles W. Leadbeater wrote that Sanat Kumara was the "King" or Lord of the World, and the head of the Great White Brotherhood of Mahatmas who had revealed the principles of theosophy.

== Initiation ==
According to C.W. Leadbeater, Initiation is a process by which "we try to develop ourselves not that we may become great and wise, but that we may have the power and knowledge to work for humanity to the best effect." According to Alice Bailey, Initiation is the "process of undergoing an expansion of consciousness"

== Periodization ==
=== The fall of man ===
It is believed that since the "fall of man" during the time of the incarnation of the fourth root race, imperfection, limitations and discord increasingly entered into the world. The memory body is considered to have become known as a "soul", and this temporary personality has taken on the sense of a self that is separated and not connected to God. It is believed that a "Dictation" from Maitreya further clarified this matter through the "Messenger", Geraldine Innocente, on September 27, 1954, when what occurred during the time of the fourth root race was described:

Curiosity, rebellion against holding true to the Divine Pattern and the use of thought and feeling in creation of imperfection, began the building of what you call the 'soul'. It is a consciousness apart from the full Purity of God. The first thought a man had that was imperfect and impure, energized by a secret feeling, was a cause and that, sent out into the atmosphere, created an effect. Like a boomerang, the effect came back into the consciousness and made a record. That record was the beginning of an impression. Energy sent out in a certain manner returned to affect the lifestream who had sent it forth and there began to be created a shadow between the I AM Presence and the human consciousness. Endeavoring to contact the Presence, the individual would find these 'tramp' thoughts and feelings flowing through that line of contact until more and more imperfect was the conscious use of them. Finally, those centers got completely away from the control of the ego and acted independently.

=== Dawning Golden Age ===
Students of the Ascended Master Teachings believe that this world is destined to again have a Golden Age, a "Heaven on Earth", that will be permanent, unlike previous Golden Ages millions of years ago.

== The Great White Brotherhood ==
The Great White Brotherhood, in belief systems akin to Theosophy, are said to be supernatural beings of great power who spread spiritual teachings through selected humans. The members of the Brotherhood may be known as the Masters of the Ancient Wisdom or the Ascended masters. Various people have said they have received messages from these beings, including most notably Helena Blavatsky (Theosophy), Aleister Crowley (Thelema), Alice Bailey (New Group of World Servers), Guy Ballard ("I AM" Activity), Geraldine Innocente (The Bridge to Freedom), Mark L. Prophet & Elizabeth Clare Prophet (Church Universal and Triumphant) and Benjamin Creme (Share International).

The Masters are collectively called the "Great White Brotherhood" by various theosophists and esotericists. The use of the term white refers to their advanced spirituality (in other words, that they have a white colored aura) and has nothing to do with race. Blavatsky described many of the Masters as ethnically Tibetan or Indian (Hindu), not European. She did, however, describe them as being from all cultures and races, such as the "Greek gentleman" known as Hilarion.

Belief in the Brotherhood and the Masters is an essential part of the syncretistic teachings of various organizations that have taken the Theosophical philosophical concepts and added their own elements. Examples of those believed to be ascended masters by these organizations are: Jesus, Sanat Kumara, Buddha, Maitreya, Confucius, Lord Lanto (Confucius' historical mentor), Mary the mother of Jesus, Lady Master Nada, Enoch, Kwan Yin, Saint Germain, and Koot Hoomi (Kuthumi), to name but a few. It is believed that all of these put aside any differences they might have had in their Earthly careers, and unite instead to advance the spiritual well-being of humanity.

== Dictations ==
Within "The I AM Activity" (founded by Guy Ballard in the early 1930s), claimed contact and cooperation with the ascended masters became a central part of each member's life. Through the Ballards as "messengers", the ascended masters were believed to have regularly communicated with the students of "The I AM Activity". These supposed addresses (known as "Dictations") were delivered before gatherings of members in Conclaves held throughout the United States of America, and published in the monthly periodical The Voice of The "I AM", and some were collected and reprinted in the "green books" of The Saint Germain Series. In all, 3,834 claimed Dictations from the Masters were received through Guy and Edna Ballard. Other "Ascended Master Activities" believed that the ascended masters, cosmic beings, Elohim, and Archangels continued to present a program for both individual development and spiritual transformation in the world. They believe that further instruction from the ascended masters and the rest of the spiritual hierarchy continued through new Dispensations with new Messengers, such as the Bridge to Freedom, the Summit Lighthouse, and the Temple of The Presence.

== The Aquarian Church ==
The Aquarian Christine Church Universal, Inc. (ACCU) is a denomination founded in 2006 based on The Aquarian Gospel of Jesus the Christ, said to be transcribed from the Akashic records by Levi H. Dowling. The Aquarian Christine Church actively promotes Ascended Master Teachings and shares many beliefs in common with the I AM Movement, White Eagle Lodge and New Thought and Theosophical groups. The book "Initiations of the Aquarian Masters: The Theosophy of the Aquarian Gospel" by ACCU founder Jacob L. Watson, expounds on the church's teachings which draw heavily from the writings of A.D.K. Luk (pen-name of Alice Beulah Schutz) (1905–1994), the Saint Germain Series published by the Saint Germain Press (The Saint Germain Foundation), and especially from "The Lost Years of Jesus" compiled by Elizabeth Clare Prophet and published by The Summit Lighthouse.

== Criticism ==
René Guénon wrote a detailed critique of Theosophy titled Theosophy: history of a pseudo-religion (1921). In the book Guenon speculated that Blavatsky had acquired all her knowledge naturally from other books not from any supernatural masters. Guenon points out that Blavatsky spent a long time visiting a library at New York where she had easy access to the works of Jacob Boehme, Eliphas Levi, the Kabbalah and other Hermetic treatises. Guenon also speculated that Blavatsky had borrowed passages from extracts of the Kanjur and Tanjur, translated by the eccentric orientalist Sándor Kőrösi Csoma, published in 1836 in the twentieth volume of the Asiatic Researchers of Calcutta.

K. Paul Johnson suggests in his book The Masters Revealed: Madame Blavatsky and Myth of the Great White Brotherhood that the Masters that Madam Blavatsky claimed she had personally met are idealizations of certain people she had met during her lifetime.

Robert Todd Carroll in his book The skeptic's dictionary (2003) speculates that Blavatsky used trickery into deceiving others into thinking she had paranormal powers. Carroll further speculates that Blavatsky had faked a materialization of a tea cup and saucer as well as written the messages from her masters herself. The article "Talking to the Dead and Other Amusements" by Paul Zweig, New York Times October 5, 1980, also speculates that Madame Blavatsky's revelations were fraudulent.

== See also ==
- Abdal
- Avatar
- Hodgson Report
- K.H. Letters to C.W. Leadbeater
- Khidr
- Khwajagan
- Master Morya
- New religious movements
- Obadiah Archer
- Qutb
- Sakadagami
- Satguru
- Sarmoung Brotherhood
- Secret Chiefs
- Shambhala
- Shangri-La
- Xian

== General and cited references ==
- Braden, Charles S. These Also Believe MacMillan Publishing Company 1960 (Reprint 2000). The classic study of minority religions in the United States of America. ISBN 0-02-514360-3
- Cranston, Sylvia. H. P. B. : The Extraordinary Life & Influence of Helena Blavastsky . G. P. Putnam's Sons 1993 ISBN 0-9662115-1-0
- Godwin, Joscelyn (1994). The Theosophical Enlightenment. SUNY Press. ISBN 0-7914-2152-X
- King, Godfre Ray. Unveiled Mysteries. Saint Germain Press 1934. ISBN 1878891006
- King, Godfre Ray. The Magic Presence. Saint Germain Press 1935. ISBN 1878891065
- Milanovich, Norma & Shirley McCune. The Light Shall Set You Free. Athena Publishing 1996, 2004. ISBN 0962741752 Includes "quotes" from numerous Ascended Masters
- Leadbeater, C.W. The Masters and the Path . The Theosophical Publishing House 1925 (Reprint: Kessinger Publishing 1997). ISBN 1-56459-686-9
- Hall, Manly P. The Secret Teachings of All Ages "An Encyclopedic Outline of Masonic, Hermetic, Qabbalistic and Rosicrucian Symbolical Philosophy Being an Interpretation of the Secret Teachings Concealed within the Rituals, Allegories and Mysteries of all Ages" H.S. Crocker Company, Inc. 1928 (Reprint: Tarcher 2003) ISBN 1-58542-250-9
- Partridge, Christopher ed. New Religions: A Guide: New Religious Movements, Sects and Alternative Spiritualities Oxford University Press, US 2004. Describes The I AM Activity, The Bridge to Freedom and The Summit Lighthouse. ISBN 0195220420
- Partridge, Christopher ed. New Religions: A Guide: New Religious Movements, Sects and Alternative Spiritualities Oxford University Press, US 2004. Describes the Theosophical Society, The I AM Activity, The Bridge to Freedom and The Summit Lighthouse. ISBN 0-19-522042-0
- Saint Germain Foundation. The History of the "I AM" Activity and Saint Germain Foundation . Saint Germain Press 2003 ISBN 1-878891-99-5
- Saint Germain. I AM Discourses . Saint Germain Press 1935. ISBN 1-878891-48-0
- Mt. Shasta, Peter. Apprentice to the Masters: Adventures of Western Mystic, Book II ISBN 978-0692570449.

Mt. Shasta, Peter. My Search in Tibet for the Secret Wish-Fulfilling Jewel ISBN 978-0-9984143-1-7 Mt. Shasta, Peter. Lady Master Pearl, My Teacher ISBN 978-0-692-35666-1 Shuddhaanandaa Brahmachari. The Incredible Life of A Himalayan Yogi: The Times, Teachings and Life of Living Shiva, Baba Lokenath Brahmachari, Lokenath Divine Life Mission. 2004. ISBN 81-87207-07-8
