= Master Hilarion =

Saint within the I AM movement

The Master Hilarion is considered a saint within the I AM movement, one of the "Masters of the Ancient Wisdom", and in the Ascended Master Teachings is one of the Ascended Masters (also collectively called the Great White Brotherhood). He is considered to be the Chohan (Lord) of the Fifth Ray (see Seven Rays).

== Incarnations ==
Theosophists believe that master Hilarion was incarnated as the Apostle Paul of Tarsus and the Neo-Platonic philosopher Iamblichus. Some have believed that he was the Christian saint Hilarion. Although the years Iamblichus, also known as Iamblichus Chalcidensis, (c. 245 – c. 325) was embodied overlap the lifetime of St. Hilarion (291–371), various traditions such as Hindu and Tibetan Buddhism hold that it is possible for the spiritually advanced to have more than one incarnation happening at the same time.

In October 1884 Helena Blavatsky made reference to Hilarion (using the spelling: "Hillarion"):

"...an "Eastern adept, who has since gone for his final initiation," who had passed, en route from Egypt to Thibet, through Bombay and visited us in his physical body. Why should this "Adept" be the Mahatma in question? Are there then no other Adepts than Mahatma Koot Hoomi? Every Theosophist at headquarters knows that I meant a Greek gentleman, whom I have known since 1860."

His travel to his "final initiation" is referred to in an entry in Henry Olcott's diary, dated 19 February 1881, written in Bombay:

"Hillarion is here en route for Tibet and has been looking over, in, and through the situation. Finds B– something morally awful. Views on India, Bombay, the TS in Bombay, Ceylon (––), England and Europe, Christianity and other subjects highly interesting." (Letters from the Masters of Wisdom, 2nd Series, page 93)

== Function in the spiritual hierarchy ==
Theosophist C.W. Leadbeater wrote that the Master Hilarion's primary influence is upon the scientists of the world.

In the Ascended Master Teachings, as Hierarch of the Brotherhood of Truth in the etheric plane over Crete, Hilarion is said to assist the scientists and spiritual leaders of the world with the flame of truth. It is believed in the Ascended Master Teachings that before the Master Hilarion took over the chohanship of the Fifth Ray, Lord Ling fulfilled that function.

== Speculated Origin ==
K. Paul Johnson speculates that the "Masters" that Madame Blavatsky wrote about and produced letters from were actually idealizations of people who were her mentors. Johnson asserts that the "Master Hilarion" was actually Ooton Liato, a stage magician from Cyprus whom she met in New York City in 1873.

== See also ==
- Seven Rays

== Sources ==
- Leadbeater, C.W. The Masters and the Path Adyar, Madras, India: 1925—Theosophical Publishing House
- Prophet, Mark L. and Elizabeth Clare Lords of the Seven Rays Livingston, Montana, U.S.A.:1986 - Summit University Press
