= Geraldine Innocente =

Founder of New Age church

Geraldine Innocente (a.k.a. Geraldine Innocenti) (born September 29, 1915 - June 21, 1961) was the American founder of a New Age organization.

== Biography ==
Innocenti founded The Bridge to Freedom. (Note: A detailed compendium/summary of the teachings received by The Bridge to Freedom was compiled and published by Tellis S. Papastavro titled The Gnosis and the Law (1st printing, 1964; 2nd printing, 1972) (xvi, 504 pages). This book has been reprinted several times, and is still available for purchase from several sources.) It was established in 1951 (in Philadelphia, Pennsylvania) by herself and other students of the Ascended Masters, after she received what was believed to be an Anointing to become a Messenger for the Great White Brotherhood in 1944. The Bridge to Freedom believes that its teachings have been transmitted to humanity by various Ascended Masters of the Great White Brotherhood. Ascended Masters are believed to be individuals who have lived in physical bodies, acquired the Wisdom and Mastery needed to become Immortal and Free of the cycles of "re-embodiment" and karma, and who have attained "Ascension". In this belief system, a Master is an individual who has passed the Fifth Initiation, whereas an Ascended Master is an individual who has passed the Sixth Initiation (the passing of which initiation is the same thing as attaining "Ascension"). "Ascension" is defined as the attainment of the complete, permanent union of one's purified outer self with one's "I AM" Presence. One's "I AM" Presence is literally each person's unique Individualization of God, and it is each person's True Identity.

== Death ==
Geraldine Innocente died on June 21, 1961, caused by an overdose of tranquilizers.
