= Great White Brotherhood =

Great White Brotherhood are the invisible cosmic masters

The Great White Brotherhood, in belief systems akin to Theosophy and New Age, are said to be perfected beings of great power who spread spiritual teachings through selected humans. The members of the Brotherhood may be known as the Masters of the Ancient Wisdom, the Ascended Masters, the Church Invisible, or simply as the Hierarchy. The first person to talk about them in the West was Helena Petrovna Blavatsky (Theosophy), after she and other people claimed to have received messages from them. These included Helena Roerich, Alice A. Bailey, Guy Ballard, Geraldine Innocente (The Bridge to Freedom), Elizabeth Clare Prophet, Bob Sanders, and Benjamin Creme.

== History ==
Karl von Eckartshausen

The idea of a secret organization of enlightened mystics, guiding the spiritual development of the human race, was pioneered in the late eighteenth century by Karl von Eckartshausen (1752–1803) in his book The Cloud upon the Sanctuary; Eckartshausen called this body of mystics, who remained active after their physical deaths on earth, the Council of Light. Eckartshausen's proposed communion of living and dead mystics, in turn, drew partially on Christian ideas such as the Communion of the Saints, and partially on previously circulating European ideas about secret societies of enlightened, mystical, or magic adepts typified by the Rosicrucians and the Illuminati.

The Mahatma Letters began publication in 1881 with information purportedly revealed by "Koot Hoomi" to Alfred Percy Sinnett, and were also influential on the early development of the tradition. Koot Hoomi, through Sinnett, revealed that high-ranking members of mystic organizations in India and Tibet were able to maintain regular telepathic contact with one another, and thus were able to communicate to each other, and also to Sinnett, without the need for either written or oral communications, and in a manner similar to the way that spirit mediums claimed to communicate with the spirits of the dead. The letters published by Sinnett, which proposed the controversial doctrine of reincarnation, were said to have been revealed through this means.

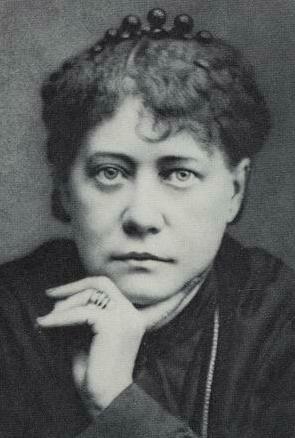
Helena P. Blavatsky

Eckartshausen's idea was expanded in the teachings of Helena P. Blavatsky as developed by Charles W. Leadbeater, Alice Bailey and Helena Roerich. Blavatsky, founder of the Theosophical Society, attributed her teachings to just such a body of adepts; in her 1877 book Isis Unveiled, she called the revealers of her teachings the "Masters of the Hidden Brotherhood" or the "Mahatmas". Blavatsky claimed that she had made physical contact with these adepts' earthly representatives in Tibet; but also, that she continued to receive teachings from them through psychic channels, through her abilities of spirit mediumship.

Ideas about this secret council of sages, under several names, were a widely shared feature of late nineteenth-century and early twentieth-century esotericism. Arthur Edward Waite, in his 1898 Book of Black Magic and of Pacts, hinted at the existence of a secret group of initiates who dispense truth and wisdom to the worthy. (Symonds, John and Grant, Kenneth, eds.),

The actual phrase "Great White Brotherhood" was used extensively in Leadbeater's 1925 book The Masters and the Path. Alice A. Bailey also claimed to have received numerous revelations from the Great White Brotherhood between 1920 and 1949, which are compiled in her books known collectively by her followers as the Alice A. Bailey Material. Since the introduction of the phrase, the term "Great White Brotherhood" is in some circles used generically to refer to any concept of an enlightened community of adepts, on Earth or in the hereafter, with benevolent aims toward the spiritual development of the human race, and without strict regard to the names used within the tradition. Dion Fortune adopts the name to refer to the community of living and dead adepts.

The ritual magicians of the Western mystery tradition sometimes refer to the Great White Brotherhood as the "Great White Lodge", a name that appears to indicate that they imagine it constitutes an initiatory hierarchy similar to Freemasonry. Gareth Knight describes its members as the "Masters" or "Inner Plane Adepti", who have "gained all the experience, and all the wisdom resulting from experience, necessary for their spiritual evolution in the worlds of form." While some go on to "higher evolution in other spheres", others become teaching Masters who stay behind to help younger initiates in their "cyclic evolution on this planet". Only a few of this community are known to the human race; these initiates are the "teaching Masters". The AMORC Rosicrucian order maintains a difference between the "Great White Brotherhood" and the "Great White Lodge", saying that the Great White Brotherhood is the "school or fraternity" of the Great White Lodge, and that "every true student on the Path" aspires to membership in this Brotherhood. Bulgarian Gnostic master Peter Deunov referred to his organization of followers as the Universal White Brotherhood, and it is clear that he too was referring to the Western esoteric community-at-large. When ex-communicated as a heretic on 7 July 1922, he defended the Brotherhood as follows:

‘Let the Orthodox Church resolve this issue, whether Christ has risen, whether Love is accepted in the Orthodox Church. There is one church in the world. But the Universal White Brotherhood is outside the church – it is higher than the church. But even higher than the Universal White Brotherhood is the Kingdom of Heaven. Hence the Church is the first step, the Universal White Brotherhood is the second step, and the Kingdom of Heaven is the third step – the greatest one that is to be manifested.’ (24 June 1923).

Similarly, Bulgarian teacher Omraam Mikhaël Aïvanhov (Deunov's principal disciple) formally established Fraternité Blanche Universelle as an "exoteric" esoteric organization still operating today in Switzerland, Canada, the USA, the UK and parts of Scandinavia.

The term Great White Brotherhood was further developed and popularized in 1934 with the publication of "Unveiled Mysteries" by Guy Ballard's "I AM" Activity. This Brotherhood of "Immortal Saints and Sages" who have gone through the Initiations of the Transfiguration, Resurrection, and the Ascension was further popularized by Ascended Master Teachings developed by The Bridge to Freedom, The Summit Lighthouse and the Church Universal and Triumphant, and The Temple of The Presence.

Benjamin Creme has published books — he claims the information within them has been telepathically transmitted to him from the Great White Brotherhood.

== Founding of the Great White Brotherhood ==
In 1952, Geraldine Innocente, messenger for The Bridge to Freedom, delivered this address purported to be from Sanat Kumara describing the founding of the "Great White Brotherhood":

" . . . I had nothing to work with but Light and Love, and many centuries passed before even two lifestreams applied for membership – One, later became Buddha (now, Lord of the World, the Planetary Logos Gautama Buddha) and the Other, became the Cosmic Christ (Lord Maitreya, now the Planetary Buddha). The Brotherhood has grown through these ages and centuries until almost all the offices are held now by those belonging to the evolution of Earth and those who have volunteered to remain among her evolution. . .."

Members of The Bridge to Freedom believe that on July 4, 1954 Sanat Kumara stated through Geraldine Innocente:

" . . . Thus We took Our abode upon the sweet Earth. Through the same power of centripetal and centrifugal force of which I spoke (cohesion and expansion of the magnetic power of Divine Love), We then began to magnetize the Flame in the hearts of some of the Guardian Spirits who were not sleeping so soundly and who were not too enthusiastically engaged in using primal life for the satisfaction of the personal self.

"In this way, the Great White Brotherhood began. The Three-fold Flame within the heart of Shamballa, within the Hearts of the Kumaras and Myself, formed the magnetic Heart of the Great White Brotherhood by Whom you have all been blessed and of which Brotherhood you all aspire to become conscious members. . . . "

== Great Brotherhood of Light ==
The Great White Brotherhood, also known as Great Brotherhood of Light or the Spiritual Hierarchy of Earth, is perceived as a spiritual organization composed of those Ascended Masters who have risen from the Earth into immortality, but still maintain an active watch over the world. C.W. Leadbeater said "The Great White Brotherhood also includes members of the Heavenly Host (the Spiritual Hierarchy directly concerned with the evolution of our world), Beneficent Members from other planets that are interested in our welfare, as well as certain unascended chelas".

The Masters of the Ancient Wisdom are believed by Theosophists to be joined together in service to the Earth under the name of the Great White Brotherhood. The use of the term "white" is unrelated to race besides common psychological relation and its implications. The later versions of Blavatsky described the masters as ethnically Tibetan or Indian (Hindu), not European. Recent skeptical research indicates, however, that this description was used by Blavatsky to hide the real identity of her teachers, some of whom are said to have really been well known Indian rulers or personalities of her time.

However the term "white" has a different meaning in connection to the brotherhood. It describes the white light of the all creator. Connected to the rays of the sun, which gives life to all living beings. When put through a prism, the white light shows seven rays of colored light. These are the rays of the ascended masters. Combined they carry the energy of the all creator, also referred to as the light of the Christos. The seven Rays, the seven holy flames of the seven Kumara's.

Most occult groups assign a high level of importance to the Great White Brotherhood, but some make interaction with the Ascended Masters of the Brotherhood a major focus of their existence. Of these several, the most prominent are the "I Am" Activity, founded in the 1930s, The Bridge to Freedom, the Church Universal and Triumphant, and The Temple of The Presence. Belief in the Brotherhood and the Masters is an essential part of the syncretistic teachings of various organizations that have continued and expanded the Theosophical philosophical concepts. Information given by the Summit Lighthouse and the I AM movement is suspect, since none of the writers of these groups are Masters of any Brotherhood. Some examples of those believed to be Ascended Masters would be, according to different unconfirmed sources, the following: Master Jesus, Confucius, Gautama Buddha, Mary the Mother of Jesus, Hilarion, Enoch, Paul the Venetian, Kwan Yin, Saint Germain, Kuthumi and even Mary Magdalene. These sources say that all these peoples put aside any differences they might have had in their Earthly careers, and unite instead to advance the spiritual well-being of humanity.

== Agni Yoga ==
The Great White Brotherhood is the name given in some metaphysical/occult circles to adepts of wisdom in or out of earthly incarnation who have assumed responsibility for the cosmic destiny of the human race, both individually and collectively. Nicholas Roerich and his wife, Helena Roerich, inspired by the Theosophical writings of H.P. Blavatsky, published the "Agni Yoga" series of books. Their contents, claimed to be inspired by the Master Morya, described the work of the White Brotherhood and the Spiritual Hierarchy.

== See also ==
- Ascended masters
- Bodhisattva
- Communion of Saints
- Masters of the Ancient Wisdom
- Secret Chiefs
- Marina Tsvigun (Maria Devi Khristos) of the Ukrainian White Brotherhood
