= Methernitha =

Swiss religious group

- Classification: Christianity
- Region: Switzerland
- Founder: Paul Baumann
- Origin: 1960; Switzerland
- Official website: www.methernitha.com/

Methernitha refers to two related entities, both founded by Paul Baumann — Methernitha Christian Alliance and Methernitha Cooperative. One is a religious group, and the other is a community in Linden, Switzerland, based on the group's principles.

== Organizations ==
=== The religious group ===
The Methernitha Christian Alliance exists as a loose association of members who subscribe to the teachings of the Holy Scriptures. Members do not have organized meetings, nor do they necessarily live in the same area. Current members are distributed throughout Switzerland and other countries. The Alliance was founded in the 1950s by a small group of Christian oriented people whose goal was to live according to the teachings of the Bible. Eventually the group founded a commune in Linden in the canton of Bern.

=== The community ===
Originally based on the principles of the Methernitha Christian Alliance, the Methernitha Cooperative is now more philosophically inclusive and in 1960 was registered with the Swiss Commercial Register as a legal entity. The organisation was laid down in Articles of Association and adheres to the Rules of the Swiss Federation.

The Cooperative is a residential joint venture work group operated on a democratic basis. Administration staff are chosen from the members in a general meeting. It has its own television studios that transmit self-produced programs. The commune also has its own school and nursing home, and a "club house", which is the center for worship and their historical archives.

Members are still Swiss citizens, and the Cooperative pays all relevant taxes and social security to the government.

== Beliefs ==
Methernitha is a Christian group, but it is non-evangelical, refraining from attempts to win new converts. Members do not indulge in alcohol, tobacco or recreational drugs or money.

== Criticism ==
In France, the religious group was criticized by an anti-cult association ADFI, which considered it a cult ("secte" in French-language). In 1976 Paul Baumann, the founder of the community, was sentenced to six years imprisonment for sexual abuse of children.
