= Paul Baumann (journalist) =

American journalist

Paul Baumann is a journalist who was an editor of the Catholic magazine Commonweal from 2003 to 2018. He has also written for the New York Times, the Washington Monthly, the Columbia Journalism Review, and the Chicago Tribune.

Baumann graduated from Wesleyan University. He earned a master’s in religion from Yale Divinity School.

== Bibliography ==
=== Books ===
- Jordan, Patrick & Paul Baumann, eds. (1999). Commonweal confronts the Century : liberal convictions, Catholic tradition. Simon and Schuster.

=== Essays and reporting ===
- Baumann, Paul (February 2023). "Master builders". Commonweal. 150 (2): 62–63.
