= Church Universal and Triumphant =

Esoteric religious organization

- Official logo
- Formation: 1975
- Type: New Religious Movement (Ascended Master Teachings religion)
- Headquarters: Gardiner, Montana
- Founder: Elizabeth Clare Prophet

The Church Universal and Triumphant (CUT) is a New Age religious organization combining elements of Christianity, Buddhism, Hinduism and Theosophy, founded in the United States in 1975 by Elizabeth Clare Prophet. The church is headquartered near Gardiner, Montana, and the church has local congregations in more than 20 countries.

Influenced by Theosophy and I AM, the Church originated as The Summit Lighthouse, established by Mark L. Prophet in 1958. He claimed to be a Messenger who was dictating messages to humanity from the Ascended Masters. In 1961, he married Elizabeth Clare Prophet, whom he announced was also a Messenger. In 1965, they moved to Colorado Springs. In 1975, Mark died and Elizabeth reformulated the organization as the Church Universal and Triumphant. The Prophet's predictions became increasingly apocalyptic, claiming nuclear war was imminent. The Church established a community at Royal Teton Ranch in Montana, where they built a series of underground fallout shelters. In March 1990, Church members hid within these shelters in response to the Prophet's announcement that a nuclear attack on the U.S. was about to occur. As Prophet began suffering from Alzheimer's disease in the 1990s, there was reorganization in the Church, which saw a significant decline in membership and various groups splintering off.

The goal of human life, the CUT claimed, was for each individual to spiritually evolve to the point where they would ascend themselves. The CUT taught that the Ascended Masters' plans to perfect human society were being thwarted by "Dark Forces", among whom they included communists and other left-wing activists, the federal government, mainstream religions, and extraterrestrials. A millenarian group, it held that the global build-up of negative karma would result in an apocalyptic catastrophe – something it ultimately predicted would occur in 1990.

Estimates for the number of CUT followers during its heyday range from 10,000 to 50,000. The Church attracted controversy, with critics in the anti-cult movement labelling it a "cult", and it has also been referred to by scholars as a doomsday cult in reference to its apocalyptic teachings and fallout shelter preparations during the late 1980s.

== Definition and classification ==
The Church Universal and Triumphant is classified as a new religious movement, while the geographers Paul Starrs and John Wright termed it a sect. It has also been described as a New Age organization. Melton characterised it as part of the "Western metaphysical tradition".

In scholarly discussion, the movement has also been characterized as a doomsday cult, particularly in analyses focusing on its late-1980s apocalyptic expectations and organized preparation for an anticipated nuclear catastrophe, while noting ongoing debate within the academic study of new religious movements regarding the use of the term "cult".

The Catholic Church originated the phrase "Church Militant and Church Triumphant" to refer to Christians in Heaven. In 1895, Mary Baker Eddy used the terms "universal" and "triumphant" in her first Church Manual as referring to the church she founded. In the 1903 edition of this work, she capitalized these terms, referring to her church as the "Church Universal and Triumphant". In 1919 Alice A. Bailey, in what some students of esotericism view as a reference to the future organization, prophesied that the religion of the New Age would appear by the end of the 20th century and it would be called the Church Universal. However Bailey's phrase was "Church Universal", rather than "Church Universal and Triumphant", and on page 152 of Bailey's "A Treatise on White Magic", she indicated that her "Church Universal" was not a church or conventional organization at all but a subjectivity or mystical entity: "It is that inner group of lovers of God, the intellectual mystics, the knowers of reality who belong to no one religion or organization, but who regard themselves as members of the Church universal and as 'members one of another.'" Elizabeth Clare Prophet announced the name "Church Universal and Triumphant" on July 2, 1973, in a message from the ascended master Portia.

== Beliefs and practices ==
The sociologist of religion David V. Barrett described the Church Universal and Triumphant as having "its own distinct theology". The CUT teaches that people are born with an innate spark of divinity and can realize oneness with God. It maintains that those who have reached their full potential have become Ascended Masters and can assist humanity.

The Ascended Master Saint-Germain is believed to have sponsored attempts to promote the freedom of the soul. The Church taught that Saint-Germain was originally a high priest on Atlantis, before living on Earth as the prophet Samuel, Saint Joseph, Saint Alban, Merlin, Roger Bacon, Christopher Columbus, and finally Francis Bacon, as well as appearing to European royal courts as the Count of St. Germain. The Church also espoused the belief that Saint-Germain inspired the United States Constitution.

The CUT identified as being part of the Judeo-Christian tradition. It presented Jesus of Nazareth as an Ascended Master who was in full touch with his inner God consciousness and who ascended to God immediately after leaving his human body. The Church also claimed that Jesus studied in India and Tibet between the ages of 12 and 30, ideas it put forth in publications including The Lost Years of Jesus and the four-volume The Lost Teachings of Jesus. It also involved Mary Magdalene in its teachings, referring to her as the Ascended Master Magda.

The Church teaches the existence of reincarnation, a system which is escaped via ascension.

=== Millenarianism ===
The Church was millenarian, having displayed millenarian tendencies from its formation in 1958. Like other millenarian groups, the CUT blended religious and political concerns. It was also characterised as being utopian.

From the early 1960s, the group was claiming that the Ascended Masters' plan for humanity was being countered by those the Prophets called "Dark Forces" or "Fallen Ones." Mark Prophet believed that the agents of darkness were most apparent in world communism, left-wing groups, and elite power brokers. Believing that elite power brokers and communists worked in collaboration, Elizabeth referred to "an International Capitalist/Communist Conspiracy of the power elite." The political scientist Bradley C. Whitsel described this particular stance as having "a far-right political tone".

This trouble would be caused, the group claimed, by a global growth in negative karma. The group linked this belief in end times to the close of the Piscean Age and its replacement with the subsequent Aquarian Age.

Elizabeth Prophet regarded American society as existing in a state of decay, comparing it to the last days of the Roman Empire. Elizabeth Prophet used the myth of Atlantis to highlight the fate of a society that deviates from God's plan. She claimed that the Atlanteans had become wicked and so God destroyed them to prevent this wickedness from spreading. She saw the spread of the AIDS virus during the 1980s as further evidence of an apocalyptic scenario, suspecting that it had been deliberately manufactured and was used to try and harm the genetics of "Lightbearers" so as to prevent the evolution of "a golden age race".

The Church did not welcome this nuclear catastrophe and hoped that it could be averted. They did this through prayers and decrees, although also adopted a survivalist strategy as an attempt to survive such a cataclysm. The Church hoped that they would be able to emerge from the apocalypse to build a new age.

=== Affirmations and decrees ===
Affirmations and decrees were an important part of CUT practice. Followers of the group were encouraged to recite statements called decrees; doing so was claimed to have multiple functions, including to mitigate karma and to attune the Earth to the power of light. Decreeing was a practice previously established by Emma Curtis Hopkins, a key figure in the New Thought movement, and was then adopted by Ballard's I AM group.

=== Morality, ethics, and social views ===
Outlining a conservative morality, the Church expected members to take an active stance on various social issues. This for instance included a defense of the family unit and a condemnation of abortion. Observers often termed it right-wing; it generally viewed left-wing politics as being associated with anti-Americanism, decadence, and moral failure. Elizabeth regularly included condemnations of communism in her sermons, and opposed socialism in all forms, seeing it as part of the global elite conspiracy's plot to control all facets of society. She instead emphasised a philosophy of individualism. Palmer and Abravanel characterised the Church's viewpoint as a "conservative Republican stance". Every altar of the church has an American flag, an oversized, framed copy of the U.S. Constitution is mounted in the main chapel of the church headquarters. The Church's communicants pledge not to consume alcohol, tobacco, and drugs. The organization recommended a macrobiotic diet with little red meat. Rock music is frowned upon, with some practitioners deeming it unhealthy.

== History ==
=== Origins ===
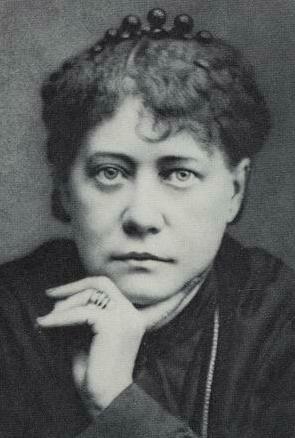
The Russian-born Helena Blavatsky founded Theosophy, one of the two major influences over the CUT

The Church Universal and Triumphant was strongly influenced by two earlier religious movements, Theosophy and I AM. Theosophy had been established largely by Helena Blavatsky, a woman born in the Russian Empire but who moved to the United States. There, during the 1880s, she presented the claim that she had been contacted by spiritual adepts known as the Masters and that she was relaying their messages through her publications. Barrett described the Theosophical Society as the "spiritual great-grandparent" of the CUT.

I AM adopted the idea of Ascended Masters from Theosophy. In 1929, an American named Guy Ballard claimed to have encountered an Ascended Master named Saint Germaine while on Mount Shasta in California. He subsequently began delivering messages to his followers that he maintained were from these Ascended Masters. It was Ballard, the scholar of religion J. Gordon Melton claimed, who was responsible for "developing much of the Church [of Universal and Triumphant]'s thought and practice". I AM taught that the Ascended Masters had designated the United States as the place where the new golden age of humanity would begin. Its political stance was right-wing, characterised by firm American patriotism and strident anti-communism, features that would influence the CUT. Ballard died in 1939. While I AM became embroiled in legal issues, new groups formed from people claiming to be Messengers from the Ascended Masters during the 1940s and 1950s.

=== Mark Prophet ===
Mark Prophet, the founder of the organization that became the CUT, had been involved in one of the factions that splintered from I AM in the 1950s. This was Francis Ekey's Lighthouse of Freedom, which had established formal classes in 1954. In its newsletter, I AM the Lighthouse of Freedom, the group anonymously published messengers allegedly channeled from the Ascended Masters; Prophet was the one responsible for providing these messages. Raised into a working-class Pentecostal family, Prophet was an Army Air Corps veteran from Chippewa Falls, Wisconsin. He alleged that the Ascended Master El Morya had first appeared before him when he was driving spikes on the railway line near Chippewa Falls, asking him to serve their cause. Whitsel described Prophet as one of "the most prominent competing Messengers" from the Ascended Masters amid the vacuum caused by Ballard's death.

Prophet severed his links with the Lighthouse of Freedom in 1958. From Washington DC, where he had lived with his wife and children since the mid-1950s, he then established his own group, the Summit Lighthouse. For several years there was friction between the Summit Lighthouse and the Lighthouse of Freedom. Prophet printed the messages he claimed to have received from the Ascended Masters in a publication, Ashram Notes, that was then mailed to members, who at that time largely resided in suburban parts of Washington DC.

==== Meeting Elizabeth Prophet ====
Prophet embarked on a speaking tour of colleges in the north-eastern states. In April 1961 he spoke at Boston University, where he met a 21-year old undergraduate student of political science, Elizabeth Clare Ytreberg (née Wulf). Born to a German father and Swiss mother, the latter of whom was a Christian Scientist, Elizabeth had an interest in esotericism. Like Prophet, Elizabeth was married, but they swiftly established a relationship, annulled their existing marriages, and married each other. Between 1961 and 1966, Prophet trained his new wife to become a co-Messenger of the Ascended Masters, claiming that he was doing so with the assistance of two Ascended Masters in particular, Morya and Saint Germain.

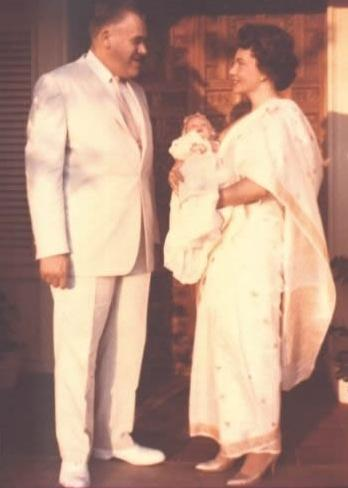
Mark and Elizabeth Prophet

In 1962 the Prophets moved the Summit Lighthouse headquarters to Fairfax, Virginia, establishing a teaching center in their home. They then established an inner circle of dedicated members within the Lighthouse, known as the Keepers of the Flame Fraternity. There, they purchased a mechanised printing press, allowing them to greatly expand the production of Ashram Notes. Mark Prophet's 1965 book The Soulless Ones reflected his growing concerns about extraterrestrials whom he thought were combating the Ascended Masters' efforts to perfect human society.

The Prophets briefly relocated to Vienna, Virginia and then in 1965 to Colorado Springs. There they bought a 19th-century mansion in the centre of the city, which became their home and the Summit Lighthouse's headquarters; they named it La Tourelle. The group's most committed members moved into this property with the Prophets and their children. Whitsel believed that the relocation to Colorado and away from the vicinity of Washington DC reflected the group's growing suspicion of the federal government; by this point, the group was espousing a belief in a conspiracy of the government, mainstream religion, and extraterrestrials to combat its attempts to build earthly perfection.

In Colorado Springs, they replaced Ashram Notes with Pearls of Wisdom, a weekly newspaper distributed for free to anyone interested, allowing them to attract a larger pool of people around their work. In Colorado, the Summit Lighthouse launched its nationwide conferences, called Ascended Master Conclaves, initially held on a 200-acre ranch outside the city which they leased.

In 1969 they established a regional teaching center in Santa Barbara, calling it "the Motherhouse". By 1971 this was being used as the site for the administration of a two-week training course, called the Ascended Master University. In 1970 they also launched the Montessori International School for the children of their followers, which was based on the educational theories of Maria Montessori. Between 1969 and 1972, the Prophets began traveling abroad – to Latin America, Africa, the Middle East, Europe, and India – to promote their teachings. Over the course of the 1970s, the group would see a substantial growth in its membership. In 1972, the Prophets issued Climb the Highest Mountain, a book explaining their teachings.

=== Elizabeth Prophet's leadership ===
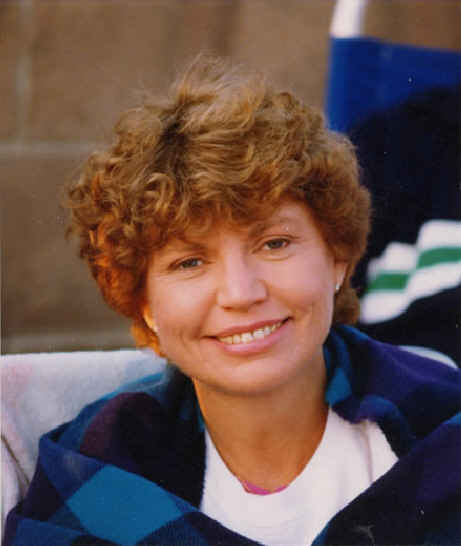
Elizabeth Clare Prophet, photographed in 1984

On February 26, 1973, Mark Prophet died of a sudden seizure, leaving his wife, then aged 33, as the group's sole leader, as well as their sole Messenger of the Ascended Masters. She announced that Mark had become an Ascended Master known as Lanello; this was similar to a claim made by Edna Ballard after Guy Ballard's death. Elizabeth then stated that she felt called by Jesus to reconstitute the Summit Lighthouse in new form as the Church Universal and Triumphant. As part of this, the old institutional structure was broken up, new by-laws introduced, and a new board of elders introduced. The Summit Lighthouse became the publishing arm of the new CUT. Elizabeth stated that the name "Church Universal and Triumphant" had been suggested to her by Pope John XXIII, an Ascended Master.

Elizabeth began calling herself the "Vicar of Christ." Elizabeth emphasised the importance of the feminine Mother as a counterpart to the male Father. She presented an image of herself as the "Divine Mother," manifesting the Virgin Mary, the "Maker of the Flame." Church members called Elizabeth "Mother, or "Guru Ma."

In 1973, Elizabeth moved to Santa Barbara as her permanent home. That year she extended the training programme operating there from two to twelve weeks and renamed it as the Summit University. Under Elizabeth's leadership, new teaching centres were established in US cities like Minneapolis, Washington DC, and New York City, while she continued making extended lecture tours across the country. 1973 also saw the CUT form the Lanello Reserves Inc, a private, property-making corporation that focused on trading in gold and silver coins; Prophet headed its board of directors. The CUT's members were encouraged to transfer their savings into gold and bullion, reflecting the Church's mistrust of the Federal Reserve and banking system. The Church also formed a survival food processing business in Colorado Springs, with Prophet's rhetoric becoming increasingly survivalist during the 1970s and the Church selling survival equipment to its members.

She also announced the launch of Operation Christ Command in 1973, to alert its members to the likelihood of nuclear war with the Soviet Union. Fearing the collapse of American society, some high-ranking members spent $100,000 on large numbers of firearms; these were officially obtained through a joint-stock company, the Rocky Mountain Sportsmen Club, to provide Prophet and the Church with plausible deniability. These weapons were initially stored on Church property before being moved elsewhere.

==== Creating Camelot and Glastonbury ====
In 1977, the CUT spent $5.6 million purchasing a 218-acre property near Malibu on Mulholland Highway, naming it "Camelot" after the legendary Arthurian city. The Church's growing presence in California generated problems with local communities and the media, with areas of contention arising over the CUT's observance of zoning laws and negative reports provided by former Church members. Negative attitudes towards the Church were exacerbated by the growth of the anti-cult movement during the 1970s; sentiments that peaked following the Jonestown mass suicide of Peoples Temple members in November 1978. The CUT's detractors alleged that the CUT brainwashed members using mind-control techniques so as to separate them from their families and ensure their loyalty to the group. Media reports alleged that Prophet accumulated wealth and used it to fund a comfortable lifestyle, while members lived more modestly.

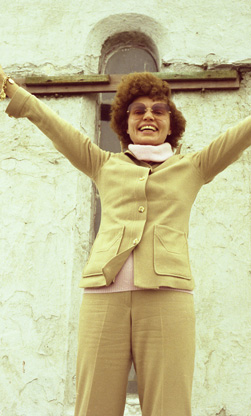
Prophet on a visit to Croagh Patrick in Ireland in 1980

Shortly after Mark Prophet's death, Elizabeth married another senior Church member, Randall King, although they divorced in 1980. In 1983, King filed a legal action against the Church, claiming involuntary servitude, fraud, and emotional distress; he settled out of court. Further legal issues arose with other ex-members in the 1980s; in 1986, the Church brought a suit against Gregory Mull to recover a $37,000 loan. He counter-sued for fraud, involuntary servitude, and extortion, and won his case, being awarded $1.5 million in damages. From 1981, the CUT began acquiring large tracts of land in southwest Montana, near the Teton Mountains. These mountains had been important for I AM and subsequent groups based upon its teachings, which regarded the Tetons as the hollow dwelling place of Saint Germaine. The Church initially acquired a 12,000 acre ranch formerly owned by Malcolm Forbes before gaining neighboring land throughout the 1980s, to the extent that their Royal Teton Ranch amounted to over 24,000 acres.

In Park County, Montana, there were growing concerns among locals that the CUT would use its growing presence for a political takeover; this was particularly a concern given that these were the tactics employed by Rajneesh’s religious community in Ashland, Oregon. Some locals as well as environmentalists were also concerned about the CUT's construction projects at the Royal Teton Ranch; they had hoped that the land would have been incorporated into the nearby Gallatin National Forest. Officials at Yellowstone were particularly frustrated that the Church's building was interfering with wildlife migration. In early 1981, the US Representative Wayne Owens tried to introduce measures that would have allowed the government to compulsorily purchase the Royal Teton Ranch, but these proved unsuccessful.

In 1986, the Church officially moved its headquarters to the Royal Teton Ranch in Montana, selling Camelot to Japanese investors representing the Soka Gakkai Buddhist group. Prophet related that the Montana ranch offered her followers "protection from economic collapse, bank failure, civil disorder, war, and cataclysm". The ranch became home to around 600 Church members, all of whom had to be members of the Keepers of the Flame. Many established homes on an area around 15 miles north of the ranch, near the hamlet of Emigrant; they called it Glastonbury after the town in England with Arthurian associations. Life in Montana provided greater levels of autonomy and social isolation for the group; according to Whitsel, moving there "facilitated the further entrenchment of a countercultural outlook" among the Church.

Following the move to Montana, the belief in a forthcoming major disaster became increasingly prominent within the group. In 1980, it published Prophecy for the 1980s, making apocalyptic predictions.

==== Entering a survivalist strategy ====
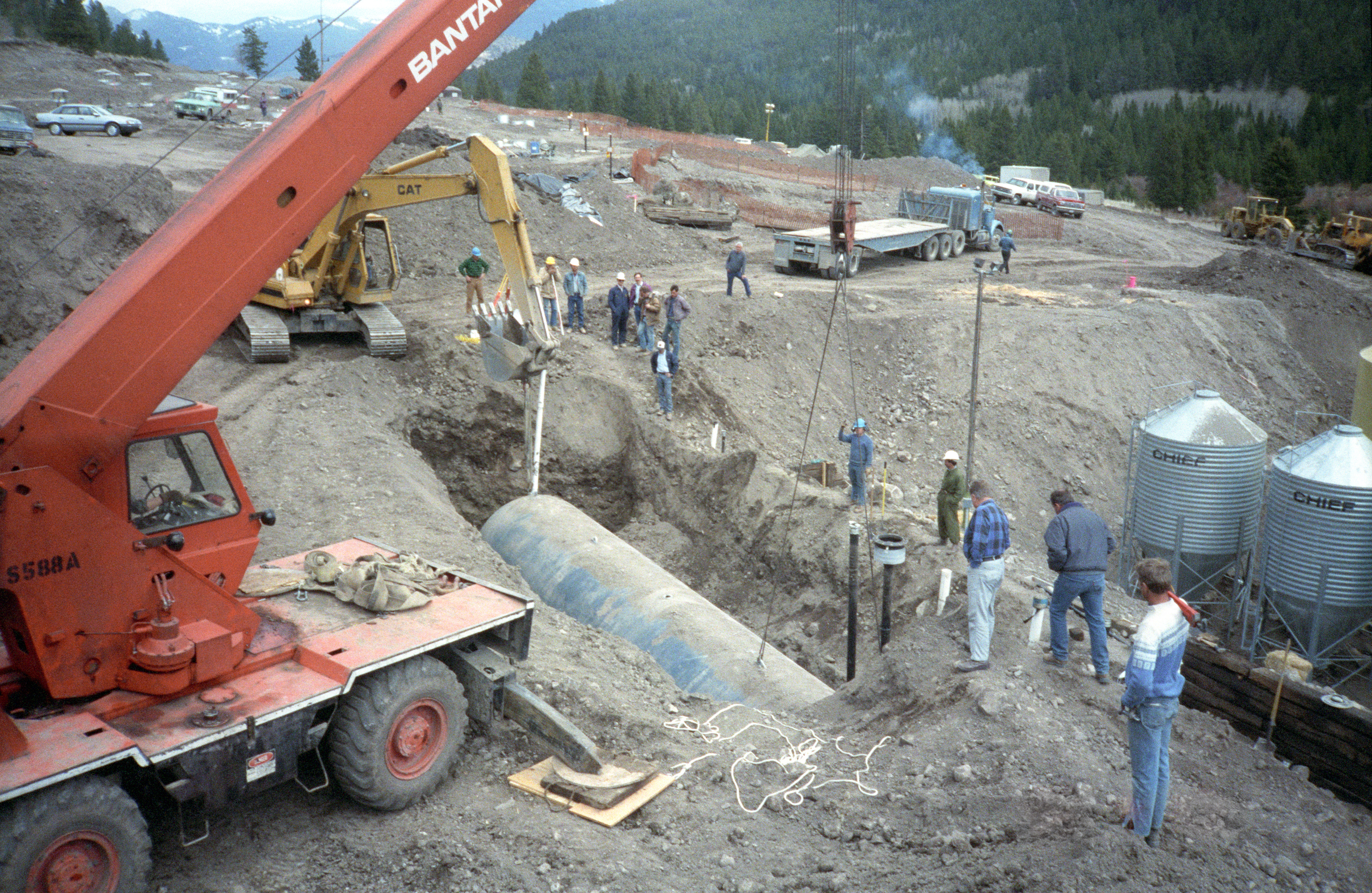
A leaking fuel tank being removed at a bomb shelter on the Royal Teton Ranch in 1990

In the late 1980s, the CUT entered a survivalist strategy. Prophet stated that the world had entered a "danger period of accelerated negative karma" and that this would precipitate a Soviet nuclear strike against the United States. She insisted that the liberalising glasnost project of Soviet leader Mikhail Gorbachev was a propaganda front and that his government was planning a nuclear attack. In a 1986 Thanksgiving message that she claimed came through her from Saint Germain, Prophet stated that the Church must start preparing underground shelters to survive a nuclear war. It subsequently began construction of a multi-acre underground nuclear shelter near Mol Herron Creek on the Royal Teton Ranch; costing over $3 million to build, it would provide shelter for around 750 people and was called "Mark's Ark" after the Church's founder.

Emily Harnett describes the compound:

Made of steel and concrete, the structure consisted of multiple underground passages arranged in the shape of an H and divided with submarine-style doors. The largest of its shelters was big enough to fit a semitruck. Each was equipped with decontamination chambers at its entrance—shower stalls, landlines within reach—to wash off radioactive fallout. The church built bunk beds with purple seat belts on them. There were infirmaries and laundry facilities. Radiation suits and Geiger counters and body bags. Huge armored trucks designed for transporting military combat crews. They had enough food to last them seven years—floor-to-ceiling grain supplies, nonperishables. According to Erin, they had a tractor trailer’s worth of Isuzu pickup trucks. Beneath the bunker, in a chamber, they had more than five million dollars’ worth of gold and silver bullion, as well as twenty-five thousand dollars in pennies. (Paper currency, they suspected, would have little use in the postapocalyptic world.) And they had guns: fifty AR-15s and thousands upon thousands of rounds of ammunition, for defense against roving bands of marauders. All told, the church spent around $12 million on the project.

The residents of Glastonbury also created around 45 smaller fallout shelters for their own use.

The group began stockpiling food, survival equipment and other material, believing that after a nuclear war began they would be forced to hide underground for a period lasting between several months and seven years. In July 1989, senior Church member Vernon Hamilton was arrested after trying to buy weapons in Spokane, Washington. Although the purchase of these weapons was legal, he had tried to do so under a false name, which was against the law. Federal agents seized over $100,000 of weaponry and 120,000 rounds of ammunition from Hamilton. The CUT's acting vice president, Edward Francis – who was also Prophet's fourth husband – also admitted involvement in Hamilton's scheme and received a short prison sentence. Prophet met locals in Montana to calm fears that her community planned to attack others; she denied any knowledge of Hamilton's plans, although many observers did not believe these denials. Environmentalist concerns were also raised about their activities and the impact they had on the adjacent Yellowstone National Park. In April 1990, CUT storage tanks leaked, spilling 21,000 gallons of diesel and 11,500 gallons of gasoline.

==== Prophesying a nuclear strike ====
The Mol Herron shelter was completed in early March, 1990. Prophet began predicting that March 15, 1990 would be the day of the Soviet nuclear strike, claiming that the "karmic increase" would peak on that day. Throughout the first half of March, CUT members began flocking to the Church's Montana properties in large numbers, attracting attention. Growing media attention followed. On March 15, around 7000 CUT members entered the shelters, to begin what the church now calls the "shelter cycle". Many Church members, banking on their faith in Prophet, had quit their jobs, drained their bank accounts, sold their houses, furniture, cars, to buy survival supplies and flee to the compound.

In her memoir, Prophet's daughter Erin writes that at first the mood of the followers underground was "jubilant", but on the morning of March 16, many members left the shelters to find that the nuclear attack had not occurred. Many immediately reassessed their beliefs. About a third of the Church's members immediately broke from the group. By the second night underground, the mood among the followers was "tense, muted desperation". Gathering her closest followers, Elizabeth proclaimed it time to call down judgment upon America. Elizabeth herself, wielding a ceremonial sword, called on the archangel Michael to "let the bombs descend."

In the prophecy's aftermath, Prophet maintained that the nuclear attack had failed to materialise not because her original predictions were incorrect, but because the Church's prayers had led to divine intervention to avert the disaster. Another explanation offered by the church (by minister Neroli Duffy) was that Prophet had never predicted the end of the world and the event had simply been a "drill".

=== Decline and reorganization ===
The collapse of the Soviet Union and end of the Cold War also left the Church without ongoing relevance for a major component of its ideology. After the Justice Department discovered that the CUT had been hoarding weapons for several years, it urged the Internal Revenue Service (IRS) to strip the Church of its tax-exempt religious status. The IRS did so in 1992, and demanded $2.5 million in back taxes and penalty fees. The CUT's attorneys argued against this, claiming that the Church was the victim of religious discrimination orchestrated largely by the anti-cult movement. The Church won its legal arguments and had its tax-exempt status restored in 1994.

In 1996, several Church members split to form their own group, the Temple of the Presence, based in Chelsea, Vermont. They claimed that they were the true Messengers of the Ascended Masters.

In July 1996, Prophet announced that she was transferring chief administrative role to the Belgian-born Gilbert Cleirbaut, who was not a Church minister but had experience in management. In November 1996, she then announced her divorce from her fourth husband, Edward Francis, although he remained executive vice president of the Church until 1998. In late 1997, the Church revealed that Prophet had been affected by a neurological disorder, later diagnosed as Alzheimer's disease. She subsequently limited her activities with the group. In 1998 she appointed a friend to have limited guardianship over her. By this point, none of her four children were associated with the Church, quashing suggestions that they might succeed her as Messenger.

The Church administration attempted to modernise the group, transforming its image into that of a New Age corporation, as part of which they loosened its authoritarian leadership and focused on developing the approximately 200 small teaching centers and study groups. Amid growing financial difficulty, in 1999, the CUT either sold or put into conservation easements approximately half of its 12,000 acres at Royal Teton Ranch; this raised $13 million for the group. The Church's claim to water rights on the aquifer which feeds into Yellowstone geysers was permanently relinquished, and the Church declared itself eager to support park conservation. The Church also had to cut back on its ranch workforce from around 600 people to 75.

The radical changes brought resistance from many Church members, especially its hundreds of former employees. Cleirbaut's emphasis on globalizing the Church also clashed with the belief in the United States as having a special place in the Ascended Masters' plans, generating further tension. The Board of Directors began blocking Cleirbaut's proposals and in 1999 he was removed from office. Regional Church leaders had been emboldened by Cleirbaut's reforms and were resistant to the new board of directors-driven leadership and its attempt to re-assert centralised control.

Having moved to Canada in 2001, Cleirbaut began claiming that he had received messages from Mother Mary, Jesus, and St Germain, on the basis of which he launched LLL (Launching Loving Legacies). Various groups began splintering from the Church, some led by individuals who claimed that they were now Messengers from the Ascended Masters. In 2006, one CUT official stated that they were aware of 17 schismatic groups. The most successful of these was the Temple of the Presence.

Prophet retired in 1999 for health reasons. She died in 2009.

A 2020 article in Insider stated that the group had largely disintegrated and the majority of the group's assets had been sold off. Several splinter groups exist, near Billings, Montana, and Yellowstone, with several hundred members. As of the 2020s, Emily Harnett writes that the church still holds quarterly conferences, which involve services for veteran members as well as an introductory program, at Royal Teton Ranch, the church headquarters in Corwin Springs, Montana.

== Organization ==
The CUT was centralized and hierarchical. Before Cleirbaut replaced Prophet as the head of the organization, the Church was run along a three-part structure: "the Board of Directors, in charge of administrative affairs; the Council of Elders, in charge of ritual and theology; and the Ministerial Council, in charge of training ministers and teaching." The Board of Directors had initially comprised Prophet's family members, although they all left the Church in the 1990s.

The Church held annual summer conferences, typically called conclaves, to which members of the general public were welcome to attend. CUT continues to hold quarterly retreats at the Royal Teton Ranch and to hold Summit University sessions and retreats for teens and young adults around the world. The group conducts pilgrimages to sites such as "Maitreya Mountain," a mountain formerly known as Deaf Jim Knob on its property in Montana.

== Demographics ==
The CUT never revealed the number of members it had. Whitsel thought it "likely" that the Church had up to 25,000 followers in the late 1970s. Melton, writing in 1993, suggested that 30,000 to 50,000 followers was a "reasonable" estimate. One former member told the scholar Robert Balch that at its peak, the CUT's membership was "closer to 10,000." Christopher Partridge also estimates that membership peaked at about 10,000 active participants.

During the 1990s, following the group's failed apocalyptic predictions, membership of the Church declined heavily. Whitsel also noted that the Church gained a "modest international following" outside the US.

In 2001, Barrett noted that the Church had around 120 groups in the United States, an additional 120 groups in around 40 countries, and individual members in a further 20 countries. Barrett further noted that there were probably thousands of people who had read Prophet's books and accepted many of her teachings without joining the Church.

Having visited the Royal Teton Ranch in 1992, the scholar of religion James R. Lewis thought the CUT members he encountered were "balanced, well-integrated individuals", with their children being "exceptionally bright and open". He noted that many members had been financially "quite well-off" and that this was reflected in the houses they built on the Royal Teton Ranch.

== Reception ==
Whitsel noted that the CUT was "one of the most prominent" new religions to appear in the United States during the 1960s and early 1970s. Lewis thought that they represented "one of the most intrinsically interesting religious communities to come into being" during the 20th century. The Church faced opposition from the anti-cult movement, especially the Cult Awareness Network. In one case, a deprogrammer kidnapped a Church member in Belgium.

Along with many other new religious movements, Church Universal and Triumphant has been described as a cult, especially in the late 1980s and early 1990s. Articles and letters critical of the church were published in the local newspapers the Livingston Enterprise and the Bozeman Daily Chronicle. Several of the letters were written by former church members who raised lawsuits against the church. In 1986, the church was accused of using sleep deprivation to control its members.

During its history, the Church has attracted both scholarly and media attention. In July 1993, a group of academics including Lewis and Melton were permitted to visit the Royal Teton Ranch and study the community, in a trip financed by the Association of World Academics for Religious Education (AWARE). An edited volume containing contributions from these scholars was subsequently published in 1994. Writing in Skeptic magazine, Stephen A. Kent and Theresa Krebs criticised this publication, claiming that it was "as much an apology as a social scientific product." Kent and Krebs made this criticism as part of what they saw as a "questionable relationship" between certain social scientists and specific new religions, including the CUT but also the Church of Scientology and The Family. The political scientist Bradley C. Whitsel subsequently devoted his doctoral research to the group, undertaking interviews with members between 1993 and 2000.

== See also ==
- Great White Brotherhood
- Legends of Mount Shasta
- Saint Germain Foundation
