= Morya (Theosophy) =

Mythical religious figure in Theosophy

Morya, also spelt Maurya or Manuel, is one of the "Masters of the Ancient Wisdom" within modern Theosophical beliefs. He is believed by followers of Theosophism to be one of the Mahatmas who inspired the founding of the Theosophical Society and was engaged in a correspondence with two English Theosophists living in India, A. P. Sinnett and A. O. Hume. The correspondence was published in 1923 by A. Trevor Barker in the book The Mahatma Letters to A. P. Sinnett.

== History ==
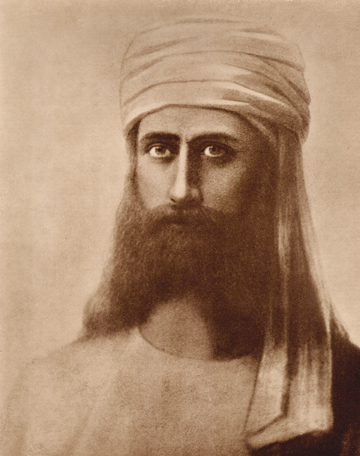
A portrait of Master Morya by Hermann Schmiechen

H. P. Blavatsky originally described the existence of a spiritual master whom she considered her guru, and who went by, among other names, Morya. Blavatsky said that Morya and another master, Koot Hoomi, were her primary guides in establishing the Theosophical Society. Blavatsky also wrote that Masters Morya and Koot Hoomi belonged to a group of highly developed humans known to some as the Great White Brotherhood or the White Lodge (though this is not how they described themselves). Master Morya's personality has been depicted in some detail by various theosophical authors. A man "living on the earth, but possessed of developed senses that laughed at time and space." On the other hand, author P. Jenkins challenges that there is little evidence that Blavatsky's Masters, including Morya, ever existed. Author K. Paul Johnson wrote that Blavatsky gave conflicting versions of her meeting with Morya and suggests Blavatsky fictionalized the story, basing it on her encounter with an Italian political activist.

After Blavatsky's death, theosophists and others continued claiming to have met Morya or to have received communications from him. William Quan Judge, the leader of the American Section of the Theosophical Society, stated privately that he had received letters from Morya and other Adepts. Annie Besant, head of the European Section and co-head of the Esoteric Section with Judge, made public statements supporting the genuineness of those letters; but she later accused Judge of falsifying them, asserting that her suspicions of him were confirmed by the visitation of a Mahatma, presumably Master Morya, to whom she was linked. The ensuing controversy led to the break-up of the Society in 1895, but leaders in the increasingly fragmented movement continued making claims about having received communications and visitations from the Masters connected with the cause. Theosophical writings offered vivid descriptions of Morya, his role in the Brotherhood, and his past lives.

== Incarnations ==
Morya's earliest notable claimed incarnation is recorded by Annie Besant and C.W. Leadbeater (from, the source states, their research into the "akashic records" at the Theosophical Society headquarters in Adyar (Tamil Nadu), India conducted in the summer of 1910) as having been an emperor of Atlantis in 220,000 BC, ruling from his palace in the capital city, the City of the Golden Gates.

According to the Ascended Masters teachings, some of the later incarnations that Morya is said to have had include:

- Melchior (one of the three wise men—the one who gave myrrh to Jesus)
- Abraham
- King Arthur of Camelot
- Thomas Becket (Archbishop of Canterbury)
- Akbar (Mogul Emperor)
- Shams Tabrizi
- Sir Thomas More
- Sergius of Radonezh

== Skeptical view ==
K. Paul Johnson suggests in his book The Masters Revealed: Madame Blavatsky and Myth of the Great White Lodge that the Masters that Madame Blavatsky claimed she had personally met are idealizations of certain people she had met during her lifetime.

== See also ==
- Ascended masters
- Hodgson Report

== Sources ==
- Besant, Annie and Leadbeater, C.W. Man:How, Whence, and Whither? Adyar, India:1913—Theosophical Publishing House
- Leadbeater, C.W. The Masters and the Path Adyar, Madras, India: 1925—Theosophical Publishing House
- Prophet, Mark L. and Elizabeth Clare Lords of the Seven Rays Livingston, Montana, U.S.A.:1986 - Summit University Press
