= Elizabeth Clare Prophet =

American religious leader (1939–2009)

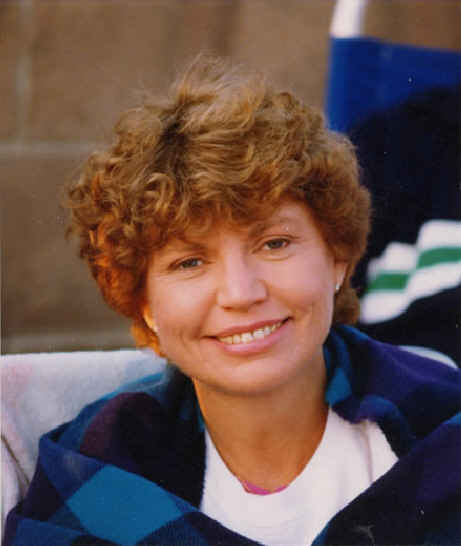
- Prophet in 1984
- Born: Elizabeth Clare Wulf; April 8, 1939; Long Branch, New Jersey, US
- Died: October 15, 2009 (aged 70); Bozeman, Montana, US
- Other names: Guru Ma, Mother of the Flame
- Occupation: Spiritual leader
- Years active: 1959–2009
- Known for: Founder of the Church Universal and Triumphant
- Children: 5

Elizabeth Clare Prophet (née Wulf, a.k.a. Guru Ma; April 8, 1939 – October 15, 2009) was an American spiritual leader, author, and founder of the Church Universal and Triumphant, a New Age religious organization. At its peak, the church had an estimated 30 to 50 thousand followers. Her teachings blended elements of mysticism, Christianity, and Eastern religions, and she authored numerous books on spirituality, gaining prominence in New Age circles.

In the late 1980s, Prophet predicted an imminent apocalypse brought on by nuclear war. As they prepared for the predicted world's end, she and her followers were investigated by the Bureau of Alcohol, Tobacco, and Firearms for stockpiling firearms and supplies in a fallout shelter being constructed at the church's 30,000-acre (12,000 ha) compound near Gardiner, Montana.

When her prediction turned out to be wrong, the church lost members. Prophet stepped down from operational leadership in 1996, retaining her role as spiritual leader until retiring in 1999 due to health issues. Her recorded sermons remain influential in the church's activities.

Prophet made several media appearances, including Larry King Live, Donahue, Nightline, and a 1977 episode of In Search of... titled "The Man Who Would Not Die". She also appeared in NBC’s Ancient Prophecies in 1994.

== Early years ==
Elizabeth Clare Prophet was born Elizabeth Clare Wulf at Monmouth Memorial Hospital in Long Branch, New Jersey on April 8, 1939, the only child of a German immigrant, Hans Wulf, and his Swiss wife, Fridy. She grew up with her family in Red Bank, New Jersey.

Prophet describes her earliest childhood as idyllic, yet also chaotic and unpredictable. In 1942, when she was two years old, her father was interned during World War II. In her autobiography she writes that upon his release he inspired her to help others who may also suffer because of their nationality, race, or religion, and that the Holocaust convinced her of the reality of absolute evil in the world. This played a main role in her deciding to major in political science in her studies.

She also writes of her father's addiction to alcohol, his verbal abuse of her mother and violent temper which he directed towards them and the destruction of his beloved fish tanks. Prophet came to believe that when the blood alcohol content creates a chemical imbalance in the body, possessing demons take over the mind and the emotions.

In her early life, she periodically blacked out. This happened in the third grade, when she was about to say her lines in a Christmas play, and recurred throughout her life. This was first diagnosed as petit mal epilepsy, known more commonly today as absence seizures, although she believed it was a way of escaping her father's alcoholic rages. She did not find medication helpful, and discontinued using it. Her mother later confessed that in 1938 she took some pills in an unsuccessful attempt to abort her pregnancy with Elizabeth. Prophet thought her mother was implying the medication may have contributed to her childhood blackouts. Prophet herself did some research, and believed the use of quinine sulphate could have damaged the developing nervous system and the brain.

Elizabeth Wulf claimed mystical experiences while growing up. She claimed that when she was about four, she had a vision of herself playing on the sands of the Nile river in Egypt. (Her mother told her that it was a past life.) She claimed that as a child she felt God's light around her naturally, and heard a sound in her inner ear like that of an ocean wave or the roar of Niagara Falls. While water-skiing, she said she felt she was suspended in a place where other spiritual beings existed, who were joyous in the light, radiating love. This motivated her to find out more about who these "saints robed in white" (Rev. 7:9-17) were, for she had always believed in the "universality of all true religion".

=== Influences ===
Wulf grew up in a home that was mainly non-religious except for major holidays; the family was Christian Scientist as a child. Her father was Lutheran, her mother nominally Catholic.

Her mother's interests in Theosophy, the I AM Activity, and Christian Science, however, influenced Prophet.

In Theosophy and the I AM Activity she heard about the Ascended Masters, Karma, and Reincarnation; in Christian Science she was told that matter was not the only reality and that the spirit part of us made in the image of God was our true nature.

Prophet stayed with Christian Science until she met Mark Prophet at the age of 22.

=== Education ===
Wulf spent her junior year studying French in Switzerland in 1956, and a year later graduated from Red Bank Regional High School ranked second in her class. She attended Antioch College in Ohio from September 1957 to March 1959 majoring in political science and economics. She transferred to Boston University in September 1959, and graduated with a Bachelor of Arts degree in political science in August 1961.

== Career ==
In the summer of 1958, Wulf took a co-op job as a camp counselor in a French immersion school in Vermont. She was in charge of a number of high school girls between 15 and 16 years old and her role was to discipline them. She described the experience as frustrating and said she ended up praying to God she might never be put in a position of authority over others.

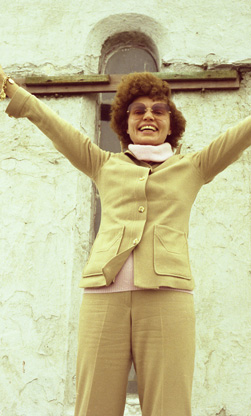
Elizabeth Clare Prophet in front of the chapel at the summit of Croagh Patrick, Ireland, 1980

In late 1958 she served an internship at the United Nations as secretary for Leo Rosenthal, a UN photographer. She claimed that her experience at the UN showed her that many of the ambassadors were not there to solve the world's problems and rather were engaged in power politics and manipulation of the world's economies. When she left after three months, she was depressed, and held the opinion that, to solve the world's problems people would need to change their concept of themselves and God.

After moving to Boston in 1959, she worked as a secretary for the Christian Science church and The Christian Science Monitor. According to Prophet that is where she learned much about the publishing operations, organization, and administration of a church on a worldwide scale. This would help her later in running her own church.

Wulf claimed she had realized she was intended to be a messenger while meditating with Mark L. Prophet at a public meeting in Boston on April 22, 1961. He had come to teach what he called "the Ascended Masters". She later claimed to have received a vision, while meditating with him, that her role in life was to pass on a higher teaching to further humanity's spiritual evolution. She confided to Mark the next day she was also to be a messenger like him. He accepted her as a student at his mystical school, The Summit Lighthouse. She said she received another vision in June of that year by way of a visitation by the Ascended Master, El Morya, who told her to go to Washington, D.C. to be trained as messenger.

After she attended her first conference in Washington in July, Mark Prophet returned to Boston in August to help her move to Washington to begin her training under him. After her first marriage ended in divorce, they married in 1963 and, upon his death on February 26, 1973, Prophet assumed leadership of the organization. In 1981 the Church Universal and Triumphant purchased the 12,000-acre (49 km^{2}) Forbes Ranch just outside Yellowstone Park, near Gardiner, Montana. In 1986, Prophet relocated her headquarters to that property.

The beliefs of The Summit Lighthouse included a doctrine called the "Path of Personal Christhood" described as soul's one-on-one relationship with God through Christ consciousness. Prophet believed she shared the gift of the word, both written and spoken. She claimed to be in constant communion with God.

The book The Science of the Spoken Word, as Elizabeth and Mark taught it, was thought to be a gift of sound combined with meditation, prayer and visualization. They believed that a divine gift (the assertion) of union with God was possible.

=== Operation Christ Command ===
In 1987, Prophet predicted a first strike by the Soviet Union if America did not implement a missile defense program. She established "Operation Christ Command", instructing her followers to move to Montana and build nuclear fallout shelters for the impending nuclear holocaust. Adherents started construction of what was called the largest bomb shelter in the United States at the compound near Yellowstone National Park, on land purchased from magazine publisher Malcolm Forbes. Non-staff church members built private shelters nearby.

Beginning on March 15, 1990, over three days, hundreds of followers waited for a nuclear attack in various bomb shelters, communicating with each other by radio. Insiders, however, spread the word that the event might be the real thing. No one knew for sure, and many children believed this could be the end of life as they knew it. When no nuclear bombs exploded the event was compared to another unsuccessful prediction of the end of the world, the Great Disappointment of 1844.

=== Post-disappointment ===
Many left the church following this disappointment, but many stayed. The Prophet's focus took a gradual turn away from nuclear prepping and toward community outreach. Around this same time, the nearly-completed construction was halted by court order when large amounts of stored diesel fuel leaked and contaminated the area.

Along with concerns from neighbors, this drew the attention of United States Representative Pat Williams, who called for federal law enforcement to investigate. As a result of the ensuing investigation, in November 1989 the Bureau of Alcohol, Tobacco, and Firearms seized $100,000 worth of firearms and around 120,000 rounds of ammunition among other weapons from the church's compound. ATF agents also arrested two church leaders in connection with the cache of weapons taken.

As of 2024, the church is headquartered in Montana and has "teaching centers" around the world.

== Final years and death ==
Prophet was diagnosed with Alzheimer's disease in November 1998 and she died on October 15, 2009, in Bozeman, Montana. She was survived by her five adult children.

One of her daughters, Erin Prophet, published a book in 2009 about growing up with her mother and is an academic in religious studies.

== Legacy ==
For many years, around 15,000 hours of recordings of Prophet's sermons have been kept in a concrete bunker in Montana for safe keeping. Video footage played on monitors of her sermons are part of the church's religious service and are said to have "composed the bulk of her ministry".

=== Ascended Lady Master Clare ===
Church members do not acknowledge her death, believing instead that she "ascended". Adherents refer to Prophet now as Ascended Lady Master Clare or Ascended Lady Master Clare de Lis.

Prophet and her followers have claimed she was reincarnated previously, including as:

- Martha of Bethany
- Hypatia
- Clare of Assisi
- Catherine of Siena
- Empress Elisabeth of Austria
- One of the daughters of Tsar Nicholas II, the last sovereign of Imperial Russia

== Bibliography ==
- Climb the Highest Mountain: The Everlasting Gospel. Gardiner, MT: Summit Lighthouse. 1972. with Mark Prophet
- The Science of the Spoken Word. Gardiner, MT: Summit University Press. 1991. ISBN 9780916766078. with Mark Prophet
- Soul Mates and Twin Flames: The Spiritual Dimension of Love and Relationships. Corwin Springs, MT: Summit University Press. 1999. ISBN 0922729484. OCLC 48715081.
- The Lost Years of Jesus: Documentary Evidence of Jesus' 17-Year Journey to the East. Livingston, MT. 1987. ISBN 091676687X. OCLC 19548026.
- Violet Flame: Alchemy for Personal Change. Gardiner, MT: Summit University Press. 2017. ISBN 9781609882754. LCCN 2016950421. OCLC 1153992865.
- How to Work With Angels (Pocket Guides to Practical Spirituality Book 4). Corwin Springs, MT: Summit University Press. 1998. ISBN 0922729417. OCLC 41851600.
- Access the Power of Your Higher Self (Pocket Guides to Practical Spirituality Book 3). Corwin Springs, MT: Summit University Press. 1997. ISBN 0922729360. OCLC 52630538.
- The Great White Brotherhood: In the Culture, History and Religion of America. Colorado Springs: Summit University Press. 1976. ISBN 0916766160. OCLC 3017927.
- The Masters and Their Retreats. Corwin Springs, MT: Summit University Press. 2003. ISBN 0972040242. OCLC 53117044. With Mark Prophet and Annice Booth
- The Story of Your Soul: Recovering the Pearl of Your True Identity (1st ed.). Gardiner, MT: Summit University Press. 2007. ISBN 9781932890112. OCLC 148873543.
- In My Own Words. Gardiner, MT: Summit University Press. 2009. ISBN 978-1-932890-19-8.
