= The Walden School, Hyderabad =

The Walden School
- Hyderabad, Telangana; India

Information
- School type: Progressive School
- Established: 2015
- Founder: Sujana Mayreddy
- Sister school: Walden's Path
- Gender: Co-educational
- Website: walden.edu.in

The Walden School (formerly The Magnet School) is a K-12 Progressive School in Hyderabad, India that is inspired by the philosophy and views on education of Jiddu Krishnamurti. The Walden school is managed by the Walden Education Foundation. The Walden School follows 'The Studio Approach' with Science, Mathematics, Language and Literature. The Walden School developed an approach and methodology that enables children to discover multiple ways of solving problems in Mathematics and applying concepts in Science.

== Studio-based learning ==
The Walden School follows Studio Based Learning developed by John Dewey. Unlike a lab that uses standardised procedures with set equipment to reproduce a protocol in order to obtain set outcomes, a Studio is a space that invigorates, inspires and provides an opportunity to create, construct and test objectives and hypotheses and analyse data.

At The Walden School, The Experiential Studio serves grades 1 - IV while The Scholar's Studio serves grades V - XII.

== See also ==
- Jiddu Krishnamurti Schools
- Rishi Valley School
- The Valley School
- Vidyaranya High School
- The School KFI
- Walden's Path
- Alternative education
- Alternative school
