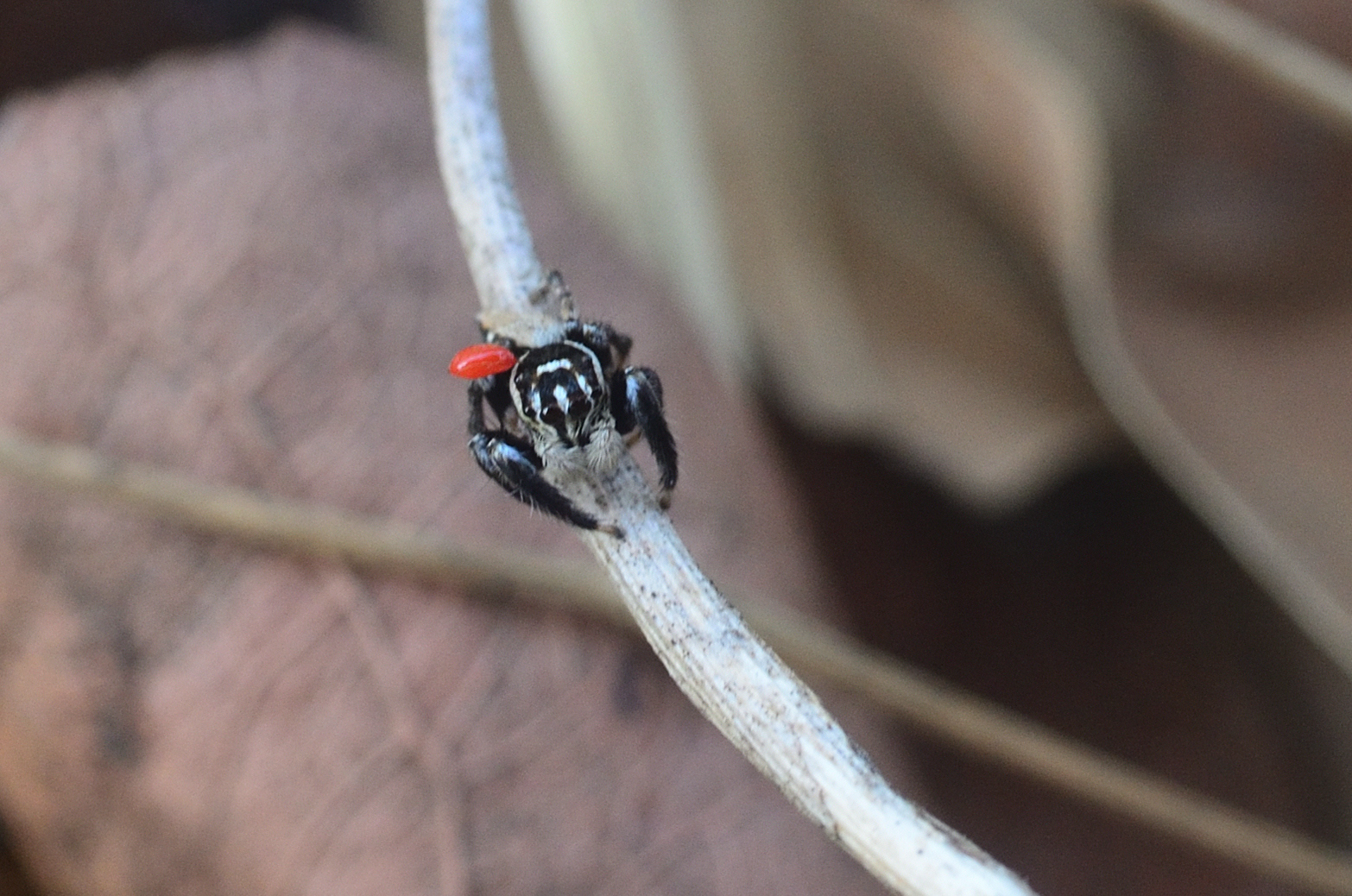
- T. arkavathi with mite from Valley School, Bengaluru, Karnataka, India

Scientific classification
- Kingdom: Animalia
- Phylum: Arthropoda
- Subphylum: Chelicerata
- Class: Arachnida
- Order: Araneae
- Infraorder: Araneomorphae
- Family: Salticidae
- Genus: Tenkana
- Species: T. arkavathi

Binomial name
- Tenkana arkavathi (Caleb, 2022)

Synonyms
- Colopsus arkavathi Caleb, 2022

= Tenkana arkavathi =

Species of spider

Tenkana arkavathi, synonym Colopsus arkavathi, is a species of jumping spider from southern Karnataka, India.

== Discovery ==
Lohit Y.T, a specialist in rivers and wetlands from WWF India reached Nandi Hills near Bengaluru late one evening and trekked up to a popular sunset spot where he had spotted an tiny spider which seemed different as he had never seen any spider before with the black and white pattern and distinctly shorter jump pattern seen in Tenkana arkavathi from Nandi Hills. He took images of the spider and shared them to experts and colleagues. Upon seeing these images, experts stated that it was a rare species and could be studied further if they had a captured specimen. Lohit then captured specimens and were sent to the Entomology Research Institute and was later found to be a new species.

== Taxonomy ==
In 2022, the species was placed in the genus Colopsus as Colopsus arkavathi. In 2024, a new genus Tenkana was erected which included this species as Tenkana arkavathi. The specific name refers to the Arkavathi River, which originates in the Nandi Hills near Bengaluru where the spider was first discovered. The Arkavathi river served as the water demand in Bengaluru and its neighbouring districts. It was hoped that the discovery of the spider was a small step towards highlighting the importance of the Arkavathi ecosystem and the need to save it.

== Distribution ==
It is currently only known from Karnataka, India. Its type locality is Nandi Hills.

== Habitat ==
Tenkana arkavathi was found in rocky regions with shrubs and thin dry leaf litter on the ground. It was observed only to be on ground at all times and never on trees, plants, fallen bark pieces or rocks in the foothills of Nandi Hills.

== Ecology ==
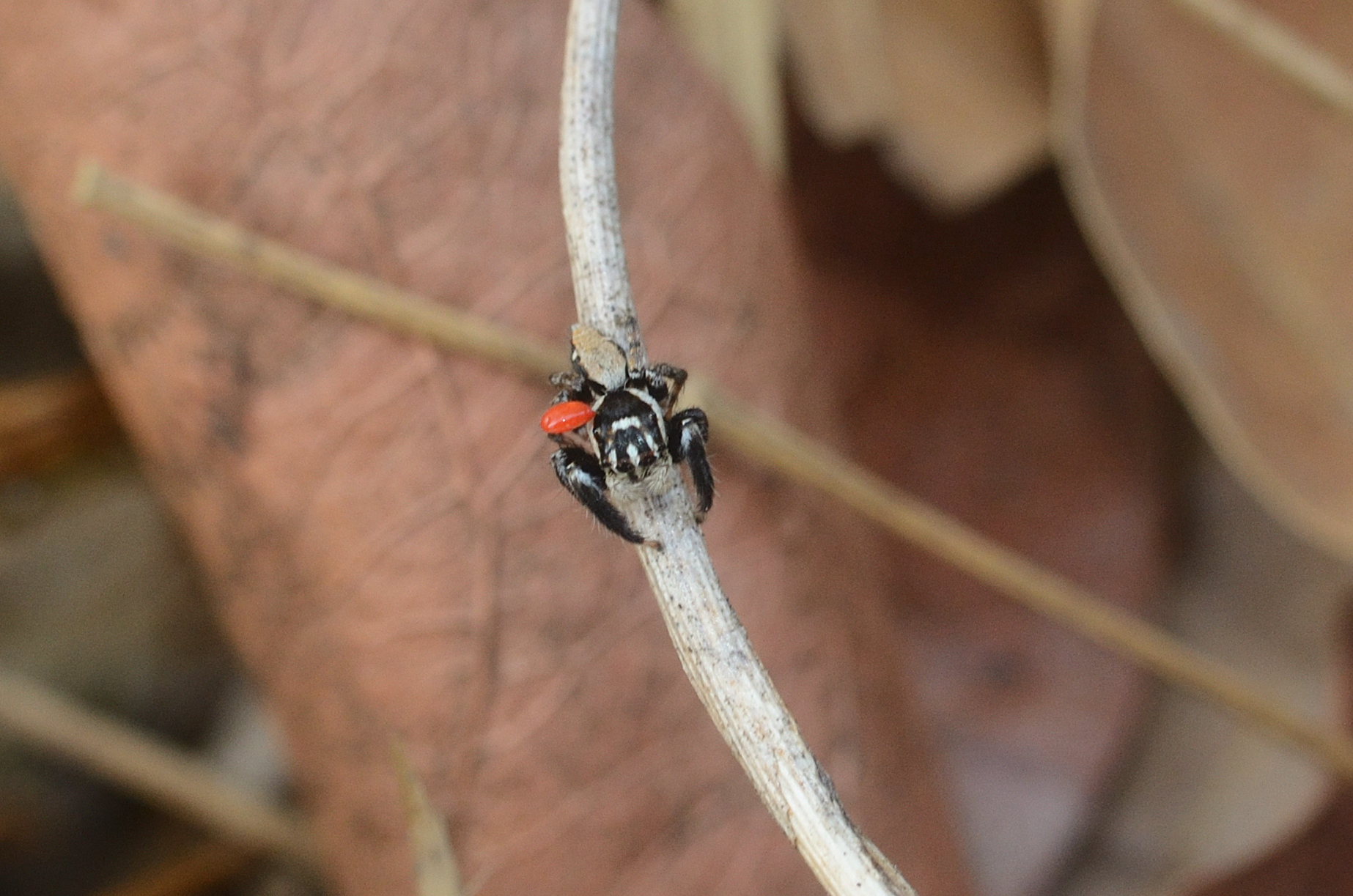
From Valley School

Day active individuals were found to rest in silken retreats constructed in curled dry leaves. A female was also observed in captivity, which laid eggs twice during the period and in the absence of leaves it was found in the corners of aquariums at night. It avoided mosquitoes, houseflies and ants but lavishly fed on fruit flies (of unspecified spp. of the Tephritidae or Drosophilidae families), on one instance, when 30 fruit flies were released into the box with the female, all of them were consumed in the same day. It guarded it's egg sac and ventured out only for capturing prey when the fruit flies were released in the box. A second egg sac was laid after a gap of about ten days and cannibalism among the newly hatched spiderlings was observed. While it took about 2 hours and 40 minutes for a spiderling to consume a fruit fly, it was about 15 minutes for the female.

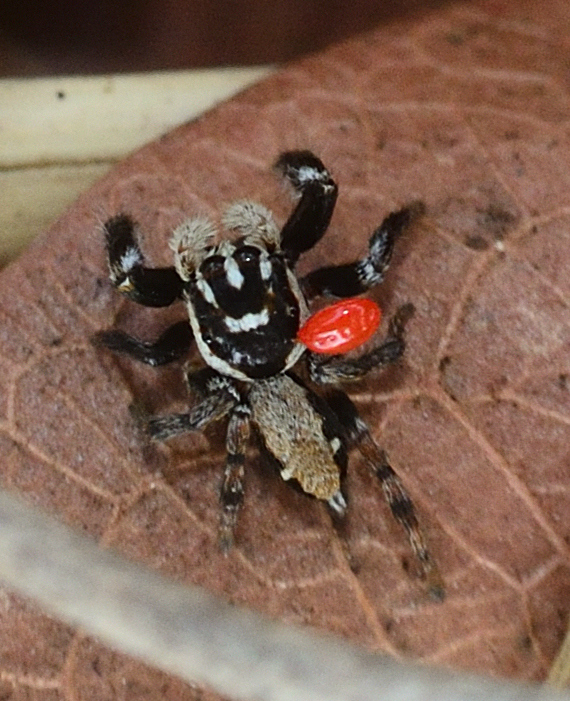
From Valley School.
