= Richard Smith (merchant) =

British merchant

Richard Smith (1707–1776) was an English merchant in the West Indies trade, and a director of the East India Company.

== Life ==
Smith was born in Whitehaven, then in Cumberland, or Appleby, Westmorland. He was a merchant and slave owner in the West Indies. When he moved back to England from Barbados, where he was a plantation owner, he brought five enslaved people with him.

Smith's business assets included a warehouse in Cheapside, and Lys Farm near Bramdean in Hampshire, once used for cattle-breeding. Having bought the farm in 1769, he began to transform it into a gentlemanly estate, Brockwood Park, building a country house; a wing was added to the house in 1774, and at the end of his life it was a family home. Since the 1960s Brockwood Park has been the site of the Krishnamurti Centre.

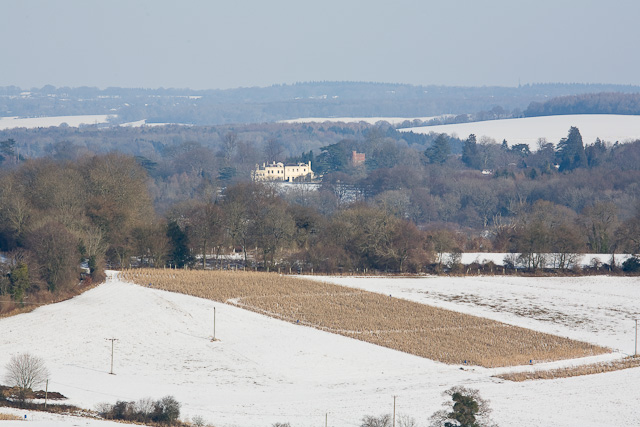
Brockwood Park today

Smith died on 13 October 1776.

== Legacy ==
Smith's will left a number of enslaved persons, by name, to his grandchildren. The drafting of the will was intended to keep a substantial estate in trust for these grandchildren; but the effect was otherwise. It was the subject of Chancery proceedings until 1813, when the estate was much diminished. This case has been suggested as one of the inspirations for Jarndyce and Jarndyce in Charles Dickens's Bleak House.

Benjamin Smith, the younger son, bought sugar plantations in 1781, to provide income from the trust arising from the will. Covered by the will was the advowson (the right to appoint clergy) for St Mary's Church, Islington, which Richard Smith had purchased in 1771.

== Family ==
With his first wife Elizabeth Crow, widow of Nathaniel Crow or Crowe of Barbados, Smith had three children:

- Richard II (1739–1772), who was Rector of Islington, and married Elizabeth Mary Mapp of Barbados — they had two children;
- Benjamin (1742–1806), who married Charlotte Turner in 1765 — they had 12 children;
- Mary (1740–1775) who married twice, having three children with her first husband William Berney of Barbados, and five with her second, Thomas Dyer.

Smith had a step-daughter Mary, from Elizabeth Crow's first marriage: she married John Robinson (1727–1802). After Elizabeth's death Smith married again in 1767, his wife being Lucy Towers, sister of Charlotte Turner's mother Anna.

=== Slave Compensation Act 1837 ===
The descendants of Richard II Smith (Rev. Richard Smith the elder), and the Berney branch of the family, retained connections with slave plantations in the West Indies, and feature in the compensation records made as a consequence of the Slave Compensation Act 1837. The following grandchildren are documented in this way:

- Mary Gibbes Allen (née Smith, 4 December 1764 – 10 January 1787), married to Captain Robert Allen;
- Richard III Smith (Rev. Richard Smith, 2 November 1766 – 23 October 1848), married to Mary Evatt Acklom;
- Dorothy Elizabeth Boehm (née Berney, 1766–1842), married to Edmund Boehm (1741–1822) in 1781.
