= Mirambika Free Progress School =

Mirambika - Free Progress School
- Research centre for Integral Education and Human Values
- New Delhi, New Delhi; India

Information
- Type: Private school
- Established: 1981
- Founders: Surendra Nath Jauhar
- Gender: Co-educational
- Affiliation: National Institute of Open Schooling
- Website: www.mirambika.org

Mirambika - Free Progress School, is an alternative education inspired school that is based on the Integral Philosophy of Sri Aurobindo and The Mother. It is situated at the Sri Aurobindo Ashram campus in New Delhi. The process of learning at Mirambika is based on the view that each individual comes into life with an evolutionary purpose and corresponding potentialities: educating means drawing out this potential. Although the school is not formally affiliated with any board, the students are free to appear for the school-leaving examinations conducted by the National Institute of Open Schooling.

== History ==
In 1981, Mirambika (Mira, from the name Mira Alfasa of the `Mother,' the disciple of Sri Aurobindo, and Ambika meaning "mother" in Sanskrit) was conceived, in an attempt to implement the educational agenda of Sri Aurobindo and the Mother. It started with 57 children and today, after two decades, it has managed to hold the number at under 150.

== See also ==
- Alternative School
- Sri Aurobindo
- Mirra Alfassa aka Mother
- Integral Education
- Walden's Path
- The Magnet School
