= Cheliceroides longipalpis =

Scientific classification
- Kingdom: Animalia
- Phylum: Arthropoda
- Subphylum: Chelicerata
- Class: Arachnida
- Order: Araneae
- Infraorder: Araneomorphae
- Family: Salticidae
- Genus: Cheliceroides
- Species: C. longipalpis

Binomial name
- Cheliceroides longipalpis Żabka, 1985

Species of spider

Cheliceroides longipalpis is a species of spider in the family Salticidae (jumping spiders), found in China and Vietnam.

The species was initially described in 1985 from a single male collected from calcareous rocks in rain forest in Vietnam, by Marek Zabka. Females have also been found and described.

== Description ==
The described male is about 9 mm long. The chelicerae are very long with odd outgrowths, the legs quite spiny with a more robust and longer frontal pair. The carapace is brown posteriorly, with a chestnut brown eye field, which is orange red at the edges and fringed with orange and white, squamose hairs. The opisthosoma features a broad brown median stripe with several yellow spots. On the front end of the stripe there are white hairs, elsewhere it is fringed in grey-brown. The legs are brown, except for parts of the last two pairs, which are orange or yellow.
