= Activity-based learning in India =

Range of approaches to teaching

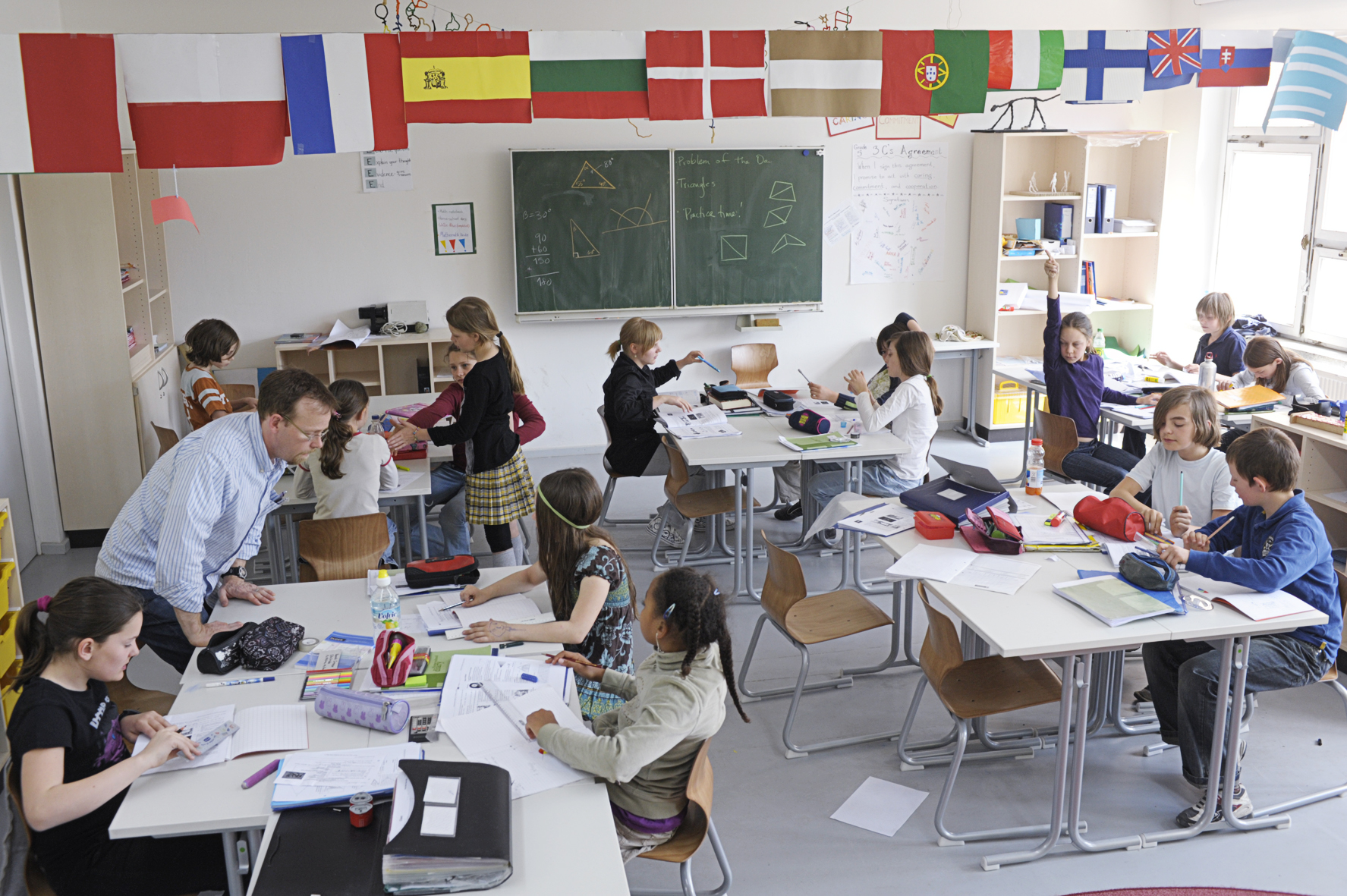
Demonstrating activity-based learning in the classroom

Activity-based learning, or ABL, describes a range of pedagogical approaches to teaching. Its core premises include the requirement that learning should be based on doing hands-on experiments and activities. Activity-based learning is rooted in the idea that children are active learners rather than passive recipients of information. If children are provided the opportunity to explore on their own and are provided with an optimum learning environment, then learning becomes more joyful and long-lasting.

== History of activity-based learning ==
David Horsburgh: Pioneer of Activity-based learning

Activity-based learning (ABL) started in 1944 amid World War II when David Horsburgh, an innovative British thinker and charismatic leader, came to India and decided to settle there. He started teaching at Rishi Valley School. He joined the British Council and worked in Chennai and Bangalore for many years. After his retirement, he relocated to a 7-acre (28,000 m^{2}) site in Kolar District and opened a school named Neel Bagh. The school was based on Horsburgh's innovative ideas and is known for creative teaching methods and well-planned learning materials. With his wife Doreen and son Nicholas, Horsburgh developed a diverse curriculum that added music, carpentry, sewing, masonry, and gardening to the usual school subjects of English, Mathematics, Sanskrit, and Telugu. These pedagogic materials were systematically planned, incorporating sketches, drawings, and an occasional touch of humour. Later, Horsburgh created a magnificent library in Neel Baugh, accessible to teachers and students. Horsburgh's initiative later proved to be a pioneering milestone in ABL. Since 2003, the ABL method has been applied in Corporation schools of Chennai, India, providing specialised education for children who had been freed from bonded labour.

== States and Organizations initiative on activity-based learning ==
Activity-based Learning in its contemporary form was first undertaken on a trial basis in 2003 by the Chennai Corporation in 13 schools. It has been adopted by all 270 primary schools in the district.

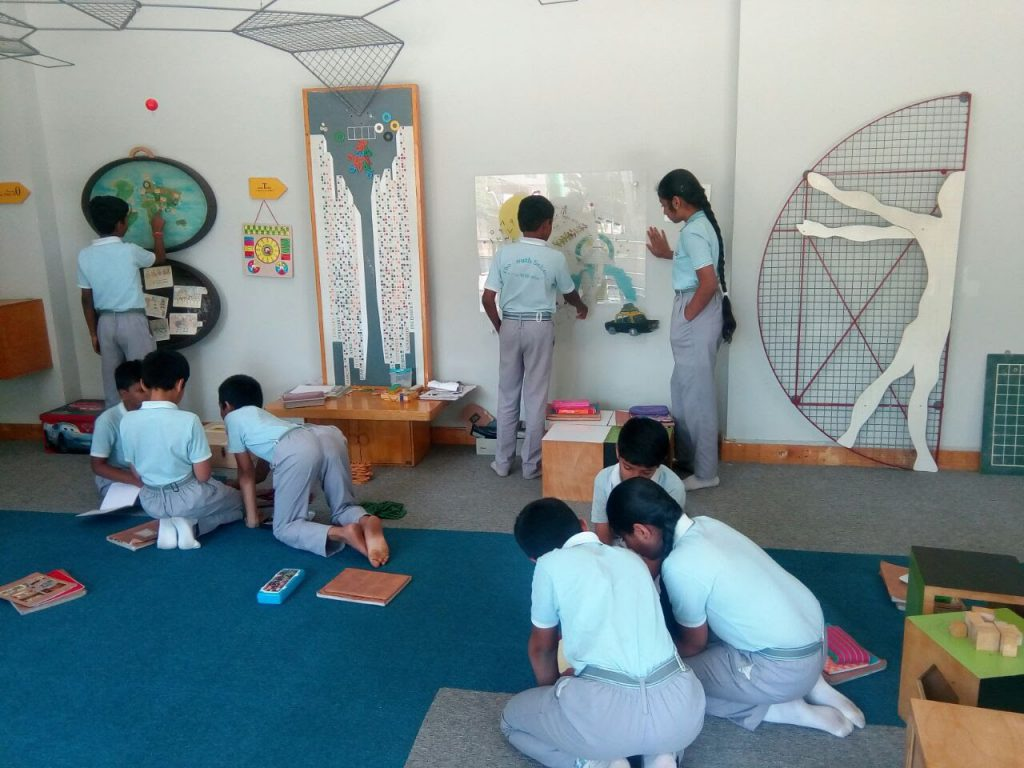
Activity-based Learning in India

First designed and tested by the Rishi Valley School in Andhra Pradesh in the 1990s, Activity-based Learning has been implemented successfully in several Indian states and union territories, including Karnataka, Kerala, Uttar Pradesh, Gujarat, Madhya Pradesh, Haryana, Maharashtra, and Chandigarh. In Tamil Nadu, UNICEF supported the Chennai Corporation to introduce ABL methods in Government schools.

Many organisations cultivate and follow activity-based learning principles. Digantar Siksha evam Khelkud Samiti in Rajasthan, Sumavanam Village School in Andhra Pradesh, Walden's Path in Telangana and Vikasana School in Karnataka have been established on principles of activity-based learning. In Gujarat, this approach was started in 2010 as "Pragya".

Many private organisations in India use activity-based learning to evoke curiosity in students. NumberNagar, Kumon, and Cuemath are all well-known organisations, active in multiple Indian states, which utilise ABL methods.

== Philosophy ==
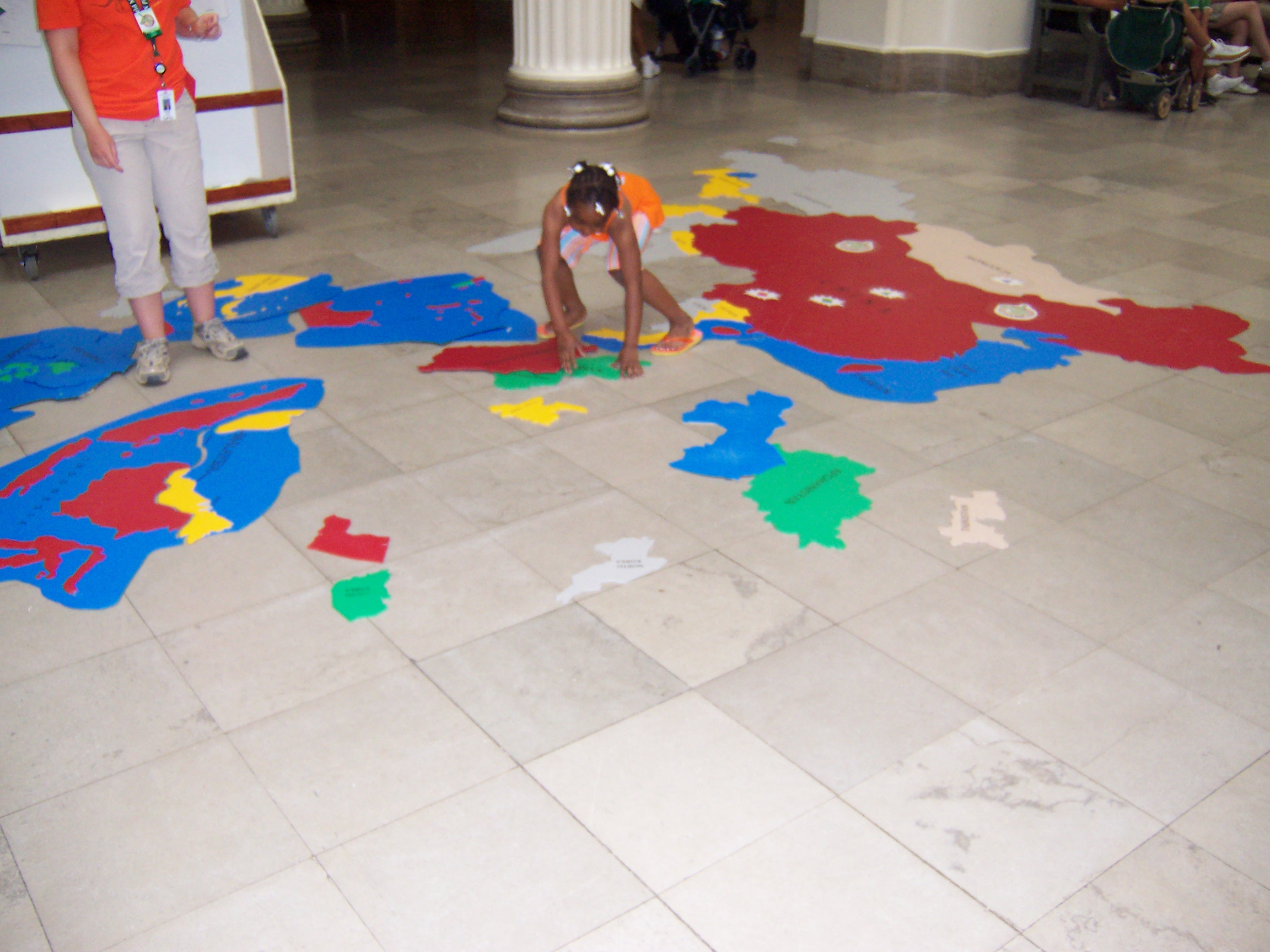
Let the child explore and learn

The Activity-based Learning philosophy is rooted in the idea that learning is best accomplished when it is inspired by the surrounding environment and motivated by optimal learning opportunities. An environment which encourages fearless exploration and the freedom to express oneself adds to the learning outcomes. Such an approach also helps students to express and embrace their curiosity. Once students become curious, they tend to explore and learn by themselves.

== Impact on India ==
In Activity-based Learning, education takes a child-centred approach. This approach develops self-learning skills and encourages children to study according to their skills. The learner is given a report card only after completing all the steps in a subject.

ABL serves as a model of child-centred, child-friendly education, which is the mandate of the Right of Children to Free and Compulsory Education Act (RTE) Act in India.

The Sarva Shiksha Abhiyan programme, introduced by the Indian Government, mandates many initiatives and creative methods to bring about changes in teaching methods for both teachers and learners. In Tamil Nadu, elementary schools have initiated the Activity-based Learning methodology through Sarva Shiksha Abhiyan.

== Characteristics of activity-based learning ==
The key feature of Activity-based Learning is the use of child-friendly educational aids to foster self-learning and to encourage children to study according to their aptitude and skill. Under the ABL system, the curriculum is divided into small units, each with a group of Self Learning Materials (SLM) comprising attractively-designed study cards for English, Tamil, maths, science and Social Science. When a child finishes a group of cards, he/she completes one "milestone".

Activities in each milestone include games, rhymes, drawing, and songs to teach a letter or a word, form a sentence, do maths and science, or understand a concept. The child takes an exam card only after completing all of the milestones in a subject. On a common chart, milestones are arranged in the form of a ladder and the child knows exactly which milestone was completed in the last lesson. This results in a child-friendly way to evaluate and reinforce learning. If a child is absent one day, he/she continues from where he/she left off, unlike in older systems in which children had to learn on their own what they missed out on.

Activity-based learning is closely related to Experiential Learning and Personalised Learning.

== Blended Learning ==
Sometimes, learning is promoted through a combination of physical objects (as in a learning/experiential lab environment) along with technological tools. In this way, technology can be used as an enabler or as a learning reinforcement tool to promote the overall development of the children. This learning methodology is called Blended Learning. Blended Learning can also incorporate machine learning and other such technologies to implement adaptive learning.
