= Pupul Jayakar =

Indian writer (1915–1997)

- Born: Pupul Mehta; 11 September 1915; Etawah, United Provinces of Agra and Oudh, British India (present-day Uttar Pradesh, India)
- Died: 29 March 1997 (aged 81); Mumbai, Maharashtra, India
- Education: London School of Economics, Bedford College, London
- Children: Radhika Herzberger
- Awards: Padma Bhushan

Pupul Jayakar (née Mehta; 11 September 1915 – 29 March 1997) was an Indian cultural activist and writer, best known for her work on the revival of traditional and village arts, handlooms, and handicrafts in post-independence India. According to The New York Times, she was known as "India's 'czarina of culture'", and founded arts festivals that promoted Indian arts in France, Japan, and the United States. She was a friend and biographer to both the Nehru-Gandhi family and J Krishnamurti. Jayakar had a close relationship with three prime ministers: Jawaharlal Nehru, his daughter Indira Gandhi and her son Rajiv Gandhi, and she was a close friend of Indira Gandhi. She served as cultural adviser to the latter two, confirming her preeminence in cultural matters.

In 1950, Jawaharlal Nehru invited her to study the handloom sector and work out plans for its revival. Eventually she served as chair of the All-India Handloom Board and Handicrafts and Handlooms Export Corporation and played an important role in the revival of Madhubani painting. Jayakar founded the National Crafts Museum in 1956 and the Indian National Trust for Art and Cultural Heritage (INTACH) in 1984 to restore and manage monuments and advocate for heritage property conservation. She was a founder and trustee of the Indira Gandhi National Centre for the Arts (IGNCA), established in 1985, and, in 1990, founded the National Institute of Fashion Technology in New Delhi. She was also instrumental in conception of the idea of a national school of design (that later became National Institute of Design) after her meeting with Charles and Ray Eames. She was awarded the Padma Bhushan (India's third highest civilian honour) in 1967.

== Early life and education ==
Jayakar was born in 1915 at Etawah in the state of United Provinces (later known as Uttar Pradesh). Her father Vinayak Mehta was a liberal intellectual and senior officer in the Indian Civil Service and was one of the first Indians to serve in the Civil Service at a time when most officers were British. Her mother came from a Gujarati Brahmin family from Surat, where Pupul spent her yearly summer breaks. She had a brother, Kumaril Mehta, and four sisters, Purnima, Premlata, Amarganga and Nandini Mehta. Her father's work took the family to many parts of India, where she got the opportunity to absorb local crafts and traditions early on in life.

At the age of eleven, she went to Banaras (Varanasi), where she studied in a school started by Annie Besant, theosophist, who was also active in the Indian freedom movement. Subsequently, her father got posted to Allahabad, where she first came in contact with the Nehru family at age fifteen, as her father was a friend of Motilal Nehru. Later, she became friends with the daughter of Jawaharlal Nehru, Indira Priyadarshini Nehru (later, Indira Gandhi).

She attended Bedford College in London before graduating from the London School of Economics in 1936. On returning home she married Manmohan Jayakar, a barrister, and settled down in Bombay (now Mumbai).

== Career ==
After training as a journalist in London, Jayakar applied for a job at The Times of India. Despite being highly educated, she was denied the job for being a woman.

On settling in Bombay, she launched "Toy Cart", an English-language children's magazine illustrated by noted painters Jamini Roy and M. F. Husain. She became politically involved after becoming assistant to Indian National Congress activist Mridula Sarabhai in the Kasturba Trust in 1940. She was also appointed assistant secretary of the women's affairs in the National Planning Committee, then headed by Jawaharlal Nehru. In the late 1940s she became friends with J. Krishnamurti and also became involved in the handloom industry. She established the Weavers' Service Centre, Besant Nagar, in Madras (Chennai), under the aegis of the Ministry of Textiles.

Early on, she became close friends with Indira Gandhi who, on becoming prime minister in 1966, appointed Jayakar as her cultural adviser. She became the executive director and later chair-person, of the Handicrafts and Handloom Corporation of India. From 1974 for three years she chaired the All India Handicrafts Board (AIHB).

Jayakar coauthored the catalogue introduction for a Museum of Modern Art exhibition titled "The Textiles and Ornamental Arts of India" in 1955. There, she met the renowned American designers Charles and Ray Eames. This was the beginning of a lifelong dialogue between the two parties. After their meeting, Jayakar initiated the idea of a national school of design for India. The Eames duo were invited to tour India and write The India Report, where one can find recommendations by Jayakar.

She was behind the Festivals of India organised in London, Paris, and America lasting several months in the early 1980s and the 'Apna Utsav' (Our Festivals) during the tenure of Rajiv Gandhi, to whom also she was a cultural adviser, and held the rank of Minister of State. In 1982, she was appointed vice-president of Indian Council for Cultural Relations (ICCR), and remained vice-chairman of the Indira Gandhi Memorial Trust (1985–1989), apart from being the Prime Minister's adviser on heritage and cultural resources. At the request of her friend Indira Gandhi, she along with Martand Singh (textile conservator) founded the Indian National Trust for Art and Cultural Heritage in 1984.

Pupul Jayakar was one of the enduring supporters of the 'Hungry Generation', a literary movement in Bengal, and had helped the Hungryalites during their trial in 1961. She was active with the Krishnamurti Foundation in India until her death. She helped in the establishment of the Krishnamurti Foundation in India, the United States, England, and some Latin American countries. As a member of the Krishnamurti Foundation of India, she was closely involved with Rishi Valley School at Madanapalle, Chittoor District of Andhra Pradesh as well as other Krishnamurti Foundation Schools in India.

== Family ==
She married Manmohan Jayakar, a Pathare Prabhu barrister, in 1937, who died in 1972. Her daughter, Radhika Herzberger, was born in 1938, and, as Director of the Rishi Valley Education Centre, presides over and runs the Rishi Valley School at Rishi Valley, Chittoor district, Andhra Pradesh; Sahyadri School in Sahyadri Hills Pune; Rajghat Besant School at Varanasi; The School, KFI in Chennai; The Valley School in Bangalore and other Krishnamurti Foundation of India schools. Kathak dancer Aditi Mangaldas is her sister, Nandini Mehta's granddaughter.

She died in Mumbai, on 29 March 1997, after a brief illness.

== Books ==
Her best known books are her two biographies: J. Krishnamurti: A Biography (1988) and Indira Gandhi: An Intimate Biography (1992). In the latter, Jayakar reveals that her close friend Indira Gandhi had personally expressed to her a premonition of her death in the wake of the Operation Blue Star incident.

== Hungryalist Movement ==
When the members of Hungryalist movement were arrested and cases were filed against them, Pupul Jayakar took up the matter with Indira Gandhi as a result of which Shakti Chattopadhyay, Sandipan Chattopadhyay, Binoy Majumdar, Sunil Gangopadhyay, Saileswar Ghosh, Subhash Ghosh, Subo Acharya, Tridib Mitra, Falguni Roy, Basudeb Dasgupta, Subhash Ghose, Abani Dhar were exempted and case was filed against only Malay Roychoudhury as he was the leader of the movement and had become known throughout the literary world. However Malay Roychoudhury was ultimately exonerated by the Kolkata High Court.

== Works ==
- God is not a full stop: and other stories. Kutub, 1949.
- Textiles and embroideries of India. Marg Publications, 1956.
- Textiles and ornaments of India: a selection of designs, with John Irwin. 1972.
- The Earthen Drum: an introduction to the ritual arts of rural India. National Museum, 1980.
- The Buddha: a book for the young. Vakils, Feffer & Simons, 1982.
- What I am: Indira Gandhi in conversation with Pupul Jayakar. Indira Gandhi Memorial Trust, 1986
- The Earth Mother. Penguin Books, 1989. ISBN 0-14-012352-0.
- Indira Gandhi: an intimate biography. Pantheon Books, 1992. ISBN 0-679-42479-2.
- The children of barren women: essays, investigations, stories. Penguin Books, 1994. ISBN 978-0-14-024068-9.
- Fire in the mind: dialogues with J. Krishnamurti. Penguin Books, 1995. ISBN 0-14-025166-9.
- J. Krishnamurti: a biography. Penguin Books, 1986. ISBN 0-14-019519-X.
