= Walden's Path =

Walden's Path School
- "Awakening Intelligence"
- Hyderabad, Telangana; India

Information
- Type: Private School
- Established: 2014
- Founder: Sunil Mayreddy
- Website: www.waldenspath.com

Walden's Path School is located in Hyderabad, India. It follows Cambridge IGCSE syllabi. The School is inspired by Jiddu Krishnamurti's Educational Philosophy.

== Philosophy ==
The school is inspired by Jiddu Krishnamurti's philosophy and his life work. Walden's Path is based on the notion that children need to be able to get to information following their own path, construct and create their own knowledge and paths.

== Learning Approach ==
Walden's Path School follows The Studio Approach with Science, Mathematics, Language and Literature. The School admits students in grades 1 and below. Walden's Path School developed an approach and methodology that enables children to discover multiple ways of solving problems in Mathematics and applying concepts in Science.

== Studio Based Learning ==
Walden's Path School follows Studio-Based Learning and is inspired by John Dewey's work and education philosophy. Unlike a lab that uses standardized procedures with set equipment to reproduce a protocol in order to obtain set outcomes, a Studio is a space that invigorates, inspires and provides an opportunity to create, construct and test objectives and hypotheses and analyse data.

== See also ==
- Rishi Valley School
- The School KFI
- The Valley School
- Vidyaranya High School
- Oak Grove School (Ojai, California)
- Alternative School
- Alternative education
- Reggio Emilia approach
- Montessori method
- Waldorf education
