= Bramdean =

Village and parish in Hampshire, England

Coordinates: 51.04°N 01.13°W

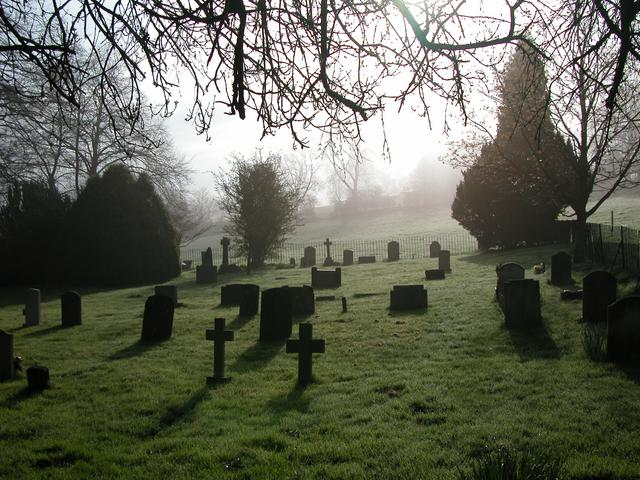
- Churchyard of St. Simon and St. Jude, Bramdean

- Location within Hampshire
- OS grid reference: SU6128
- Civil parish: Bramdean and Hinton Ampner
- District: City of Winchester
- Shire county: Hampshire
- Region: South East
- Country: England
- Sovereign state: United Kingdom
- Post town: Alresford
- Postcode district: SO24
- Dialling code: 01962
- Police: Hampshire and Isle of Wight
- Fire: Hampshire and Isle of Wight
- Ambulance: South Central
- UK Parliament: Winchester

Bramdean is a village and former civil parish, now in the parish of Bramdean and Hinton Ampner, in the Winchester district, in the county of Hampshire, England. It is a linear settlement located along the busy A272 trunk road which was widened by the American troops in 1943 in preparation for D-Day.

The village itself is peculiar due to the large number of large houses dating from the Georgian period. A few of these are set in or near beautiful rolling parkland with specimen trees.

A number of hamlets are also situated within the boundaries of the parish. To the north of the village is Bramdean Common, known for its good walks and pretty cottages. Further settlements include Little London, Hinton Woodlands, Hells Bottom (or Wolfhanger), and Joans Acre.

== Etymology ==
Bramdean is first recorded in an Anglo-Saxon charter of West Meon in 932 CE where it is recorded as Bromdene meaning the valley where Broom grows. Here it was used as a landmark to delineate the boundary of the Anglo-Saxon manor of West Meon.

== History ==
There are a number of prehistoric barrows in the vicinity of the parish, especially around Brockwood Park, suggesting a significant area of activity for Early Bronze Age peoples.

In 1823 a Roman villa was discovered in the parish containing two tesselated pavements of very fine qualities. The villa stood on the site of an older Iron Age enclosure.

The village church is dedicated to St Simon and St Jude. It is supposed to have its origins in the 1170s. However, only some of the original 12th-century structure survives, as the church was heavily altered in the 19th century. The original section of the building, consisting of a nave and chancel, is externally rendered, whilst the 19th century additions are built of flint and stone. The church retains its 12th-century chancel arch with two carved leaf capitals. The church at Bramdean became notable in the 19th century for its restored wall paintings, which had been uncovered and retouched by the then rector Charles Walters. They were later re-covered when Helier Touzel came to be the rector at Bramdean, and remain as such to this day.

A distinct feature of Bramdean is its isolated church which stands separated from the rest of the village on the south side of the A272. The village itself contains few very ancient buildings, the oldest of which date to the 15th century. These include Manchester House, Woodcote Manor, Tanners Farm, The Old Rectory, and Bramdean Farmhouse.

The lack of medieval buildings in the present nucleus of the village suggests the original medieval settlement of Bramdean was abandoned or deserted over time, with development continuing on Wood Lane to the north. Local legend dictates a field adjacent to the Fox Inn as being the site of this deserted village, however no thorough excavation has ever taken place. In the 19th century, several Iron Age pottery fragments were discovered here, and visible features of the field indicate potential for archeological interest. A map of the village from 1676 clearly shows the lack of settlement around the church. All that remains of the original medieval settlement around the church is the Manor House, which whilst dating to the 18th century, probably sits on the site of the original Manor House of Bramdean.

== Notable buildings ==
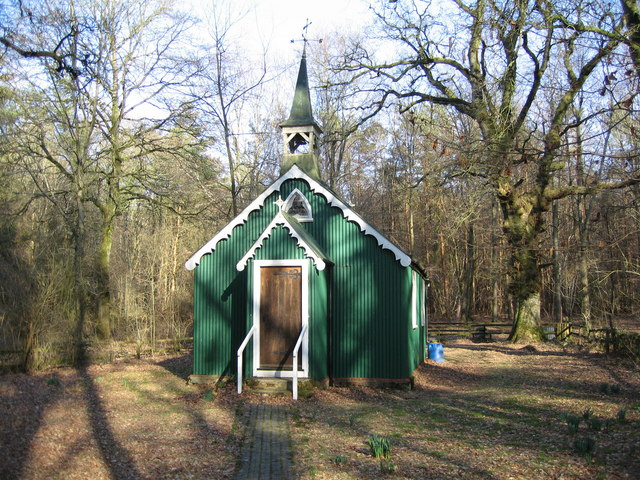
The Church in the Wood

=== Bramdean House ===
Bramdean House is a notable attraction in the village, known for its symmetrical Herbaceous borders. The gardens open to visitors on selected days each year, with proceeds donated to the National Garden Scheme. The annual Bramdean Village Fete is also held at the house and attracts visitors from the village and surrounding area.

=== The Church in the Wood ===
The Church in the Wood is a chapel which was built to serve the nearby farm workers by the Reverend Alfred Caesar Bishop in 1883 (see Bramdean Common). It was erected in five weeks, and has a timber frame on brick plinth, encased in corrugated iron.

=== The Fox Inn ===
The Fox Inn, located just a short distance from the garage, is a thriving country pub. Dating to the 17th century, this cosy weather-boarded building has witnessed many historic events, including the Battle of Cheriton in 1644, when Sir William Waller and his troops marched through the village. During this time, many of the houses in the village were supposedly requisitioned for use of troops of both sides (although these claims are hard to substantiate and are often connected to 17th-century and older buildings). The Inn, chiefly built of brick and painted white, retains a wealth of original material from the 17th century. The Inn underwent extensive alterations in the 18th century, encasing the building in brick, extending it to the north, and by adding a large bay window to the south. The Inn underwent repairs in 1893, and during works, a well preserved poster relating to the sale of a property at Alton was discovered beneath the paint. It was dated 1674, however upon trying to remove the poster for preservation, it fell to pieces. No copy had been made.

The stable block and out buildings, were demolished in the mid-1960’s.

The Fox Inn has accommodation in the form of two shepherd huts in the gardens.

=== Woodcote Manor ===
Woodcote Manor is a Grade II* listed building with parts dating from the late 15th century, originally granted by the king to the custodian of Winchester Gaol. From 1888, the house was the home of Sir Francis Seymour Haden.

It was leased by Sir Francis and Lady Deborah Haden from 1887, from the Greenwood family of Brockwood Park. The house was later sold twice during the Hadens' residency, the last time to Edwin Austin Abbey who extended Woodcote in 1911 with works by Reginald Blomfield. The house later became the home of members of the Bowes Lyon family, who held the manor for a short period in the 20th century.

As of the summer of 2023, the manor and surrounding estate were on sale for £15 million. It remains a private residence.

=== Brockwood Park ===
Brockwood Park was a country estate until it was repurposed as a Krishnamurti school known as Brockwood Park School. It is a public school inspired by the teachings of Jiddu Krishnamurti, and was founded in 1969 after repairs on the dilapidated park and manor house took place.

A stone circle was erected in the park grounds in the mid-19th century by Colonel George Greenwood, made primarily from local sandstone and some puddingstones from East Tisted. At the time when the circle was built, the land surrounding was used as common land, and was significantly more open that it now. Various accounts from the time detail the view that Colonel George erected it in order to see how long it would be before archeologists and historians deemed it a relic from the ancient past.

Greenwood also planted the rows of copper beech trees visible upon entry of the village from the east of the A272 in the middle of the 19th century. The trees were planted within and on the boundaries of the estate.

== Civil parish ==
On 1 April 1932 the parish of Hinton Ampner was merged with Bramdean, and on 1 July 2002 the merged parish was renamed "Bramdean & Hinton Ampner". In 1931 the parish of Bramdean (prior to the merge) had a population of 244.

== Notable people ==
- 'Colonel George Greenwood (1799-1875), the so-called "father of modern Subaerialism"; early geologist and botanist; lived in Bramdean, at Brockwood Park
- Francis Seymour Haden, lived in Bramdean in from 1888 until his death in 1910.
- Edwin Austin Abbey, owned Woodcote Manor from 1909 to 1911. His wife, Mary Gertrude, owned the house until 1920.
- Jiddu Krishnamurti, lived in Bramdean and ran Brockwood Park School
- Grinling Gibbons lived in a since demolished cottage which stood alongside Bramdean House.
- Bruce Blunt, the poet and journalist, lived in Bramdean.
- Charlotte Smith (writer) lived at Brockwood Park in the late 18th century. She wrote various sonnets at the property. Her book “The Old Manor House” was supposedly based on Woodcote Manor and its owners, the Venables family.
- James Harris, 1st Earl of Malmesbury owned a large portion of land in the late 18th/ early 19th century. He owned Brockwood Park, Woodcote Manor, and Bramdean House.
- Sir John Edward Capper lived at and owned Bramdean House in the early 20th century, before selling it in the 1940’s.
- Charles Biggs Calmady lived at Woodcote Manor in the 1820’s, before moving to Langdon Court. The famed portrait of his two daughters Emily and Laura Ann Calmady (exhibited at The Metropolitan Museum of Art) was painted during the time in which the family lived at Woodcote.
- Terence Carroll, the writer and newsreader, lived at Wolfhanger in the later half of the 20th century.
- John Shakespear of Brookwood, a Colonial Administrator of the East India Company, owned Brockwood (then Brookwood) Park in the late 18th century.
- Nicola Horlick, the Investment Fund Manager, lived at Hinton Woodlands Farm. Her investment management business “Bramdean Asset Management” was named after the village.
- William Maynard Gomm lived in Bramdean Cottage, between 1856 and 1875. He placed three windows in 1863 in Bramdean Church, to the memory of the Revd William Gomm.
- John Cavendish, 5th Baron Chesham owned Brockwood Park in the mid-20th century, before selling it in the late 1960’s.
- John Greenwood (lawyer) was the son of William Greenwood of Brockwood Park, and the brother of Colonel George Greenwood. He later moved to Broadhanger House, Froxfield.
- Augustus Legge (archdeacon of Winchester) lived at Bramdean House during the 19th century.
- Richard Smith (merchant) bought Lye Farm (now Brockwood Park) as a copyhold estate held under the Manor of Hinton Ampner in 1769. He built a small country house on the site, forming the earliest section of the now Brockwood Park School.
- Edward Clive, 1st Earl of Powis leased Brockwood Park from the Earl of Malmesbury in the late 18th to the early 19th century.
- Muriel Francis Margaret Bowes Lyon (1884-1968) the first cousin of Queen Elizabeth The Queen Mother, owned Woodcote Manor in the 1920’s. She bought the property from Mary Gertrude Abbey in 1920, and owned it for a short period.
