= Radhika Herzberger =

Indian writer and educationist (born 1938)

- Born: Radhika Jayakar; 1938 (age 87–88); Uttar Pradesh, India
- Occupations: Educationist and writer
- Spouse: Hans Herzberger
- Parent(s): Manohar Jayakar; Pupul Jayakar
- Awards: Padma Shri
- Website: Official web site

Radhika Herzberger (née Jayakar; born 1938) is an Indian writer, educationist and scholar in Sanskrit and Indology. She lives in Rishi Valley School, in the Chittoor district of Andhra Pradesh, and serves as the Director of Rishi Valley Education Centre, an educational institution founded by Jiddu Krishnamurti in the 1920s.

== Biography ==
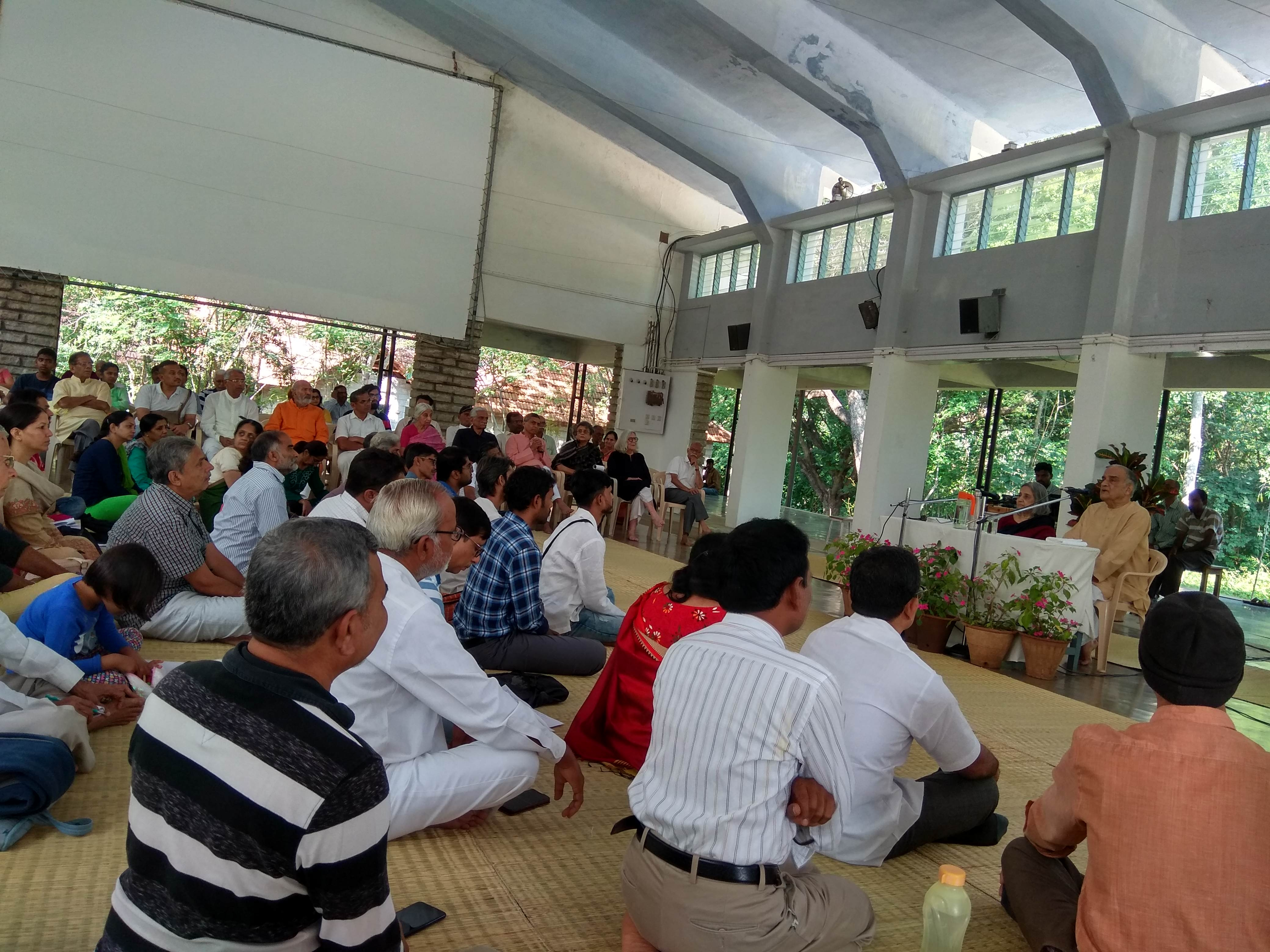
KFI retreat session at Rishi Valley in 2019, Krishnan addressing the gathering, with Radhika Herzberger presiding.

She was born as Radhika Jayakar in Uttar Pradesh, to Manohar Jayakar and Pupul Jayakar (née Mehta), cultural activist and biographer of Jiddu Krishnamurti and Indira Gandhi, in 1938. After obtaining a doctorate from the University of Toronto, she joined Rishi Valley Education Centre as an instructor in history, eventually becoming the Director of the institution.

== Publications ==
Radhika Herzberger has published a book, An Essay in the Development of Fifth and Sixth Century Indian Thought, as a part of Indian Classical Studies.

She has also published articles in journals such as the Indian Journal of Philosophy.

- Radhika Herzberger and A Kumaraswamy (2014). "Independent Schools as Resource Centres". India Seminar.
- Radhika Herzberger (January 1990). "Living lightly On Earth". India Seminar.
- Hans G. Herzberger, Radhika Herzberger (1981). "Bhartrhari's paradox". Indian Journal of Philosophy. 9 (1): 1–17.

== Awards ==
The Government of India honoured her, in 2013, by awarding her the Padma Shri, the fourth highest civilian award, for her contributions to the fields of literature and education.

== See also ==
- Pupul Jayakar
