= Tara Jauhar =

Indian writer and educationist

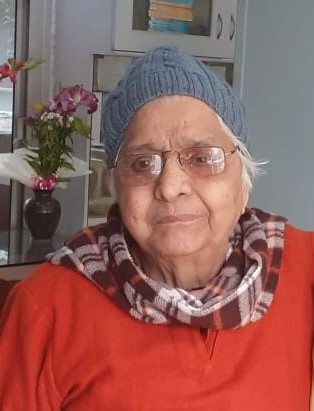
Image of Tara Jauhar

Tara Jauhar (born 1936) is a writer and educationist from Delhi, India who has dedicated her life for disseminating the teachings of Sri Aurobindo who was an Indian philosopher, yoga guru, poet and nationalist who advocated a philosophy of life based on spiritual evolution. Tara Jauhar is the Chairman of the Sri Aurobindo Ashram, Delhi Branch which had been founded by her father Surendra Nath Jauhar in the year 1956. In the year 2022, Govt of India honored her with the Padma Shri award for her life long work dedicated to spreading the teachings of Sri Aurobindo.

== Life and work ==
Tara Jauhar was born in the year 1936 as the third child of Surendra Nath Jauhar and Dayawati. Surendra Nath Jauhar was a freedom fighter who had to suffer imprisonment for 15 months in the Central Jail at Multan during the period of the Quit India Movement. Surendra Nath had been associated with the Sri Aurobindo Ashram at Pondicherry, India since 1939 and because of this association his children, including Tara Jauhar, were educated and brought up at the Ashram from an early age. In fact Tara Jauhar came to the Ashram in the year 1944 when she was only eight years old. She spent close to 30 years in the Ashram before moving to Delhi.

While at Delhi she worked with her father to found two highly regarded schools in Delhi, namely, The Mother's International School and Mirambika Free Progress School both located in the campus of the Aurobindo Ashram Delhi Branch. She also helped establish two retreat centers in the Himalayan region, one named Van Niwas located in Nainital, Uttarakhand and the second one, in the Kumaon range of the Himalayas, called Madhuban in Ramgarh, Uttarakhand. The Aurobindo Ashram Delhi Branch is also running the Sri Aurobindo Institute of Vocational Training

== Recognition: Padma Shri ==
- In the year 2022, Govt of India conferred the Padma Shri award, the third highest award in the Padma series of awards, on Tara Jauhar for her distinguished service in the field of literature and education. The award is in recognition of her service as a "Writer and Educationist dedicated her life to propagating the teachings of Sri Aurobindo".

== Auro-Ratna Award ==
Overman Foundation, a research institute based in Kolkata dedicated to the ideals of Sri Aurobindo and Mother conferred the Auro-Ratna Award on Tara Jauhar in the year 2017.

== Controversies ==
- Tara Jauhar has also been accused of alleged Manipulation in Admissions to The Mothers International School.
- Tara Jauhar has also been accused of alleged Lobbying for the Padma Shri Award.

== Books ==
Tara Jauhar has written a few books explaining her experiences with The Mother the collaborator of Sri Aurobindo, who considered her to be of equal yogic stature to him and called her by the name "The Mother".

- Tara Jauhar. Learning with the Mother. The Incarnate World. (The full text of the book is available at the cited link.)
- Tara Jauhar (1 January 2015). Growing Up with the Mother. New Delhi: Matri Store. (The full text of the book is available for free download in the Internet Archive.)

== See also ==
- Padma Shri Award recipients in the year 2022
