= Valley School =

Valley School may refer to:

- The Valley School, India
- Valley High School (West Des Moines, Iowa)
- Valley School (Orderville, Utah), listed on the NRHP in Kane County, Utah
