= Surendra Nath Jauhar =

Indian independence activist (1903–1986)

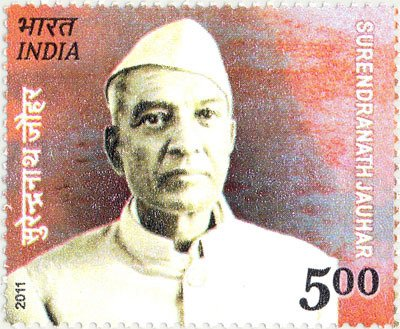
- India Post stamp released in memory of Surendra Nath Jauhar, 2011
- Born: Sikandar Lal; 13 August 1903; Vahalee, Jhelum District, West Punjab, India
- Died: 2 September 1986 (aged 83); New Delhi, India
- Education: D.A.V. College (Lahore), National College, Lahore
- Occupations: Freedom fighter; Spiritual leader
- Spouse: Dayawati
- Children: Narendra, Anil, Tara, Chitra, Lata, Purnima.

Surendra Nath Jauhar (13 August 1903 – 2 September 1986) was an Indian freedom fighter, social worker, educationist, and spiritual leader associated with the teachings of Sri Aurobindo and The Mother. He participated in the Indian independence movement, including the Civil Disobedience Movement and the Quit India Movement, and later founded the Delhi Branch of the Sri Aurobindo Ashram.

== Early life and education ==
Surendra Nath Jauhar was born on 13 August 1903 in Vahalee village, Jhelum District, Punjab Province, British India (now in Pakistan). He received his education at D.A.V. College (Lahore) and National College, Lahore. During his student years, he became involved in the Indian freedom movement.

== Freedom movement ==
Inspired by Mahatma Gandhi, Jauhar joined the national movement at a young age. He participated in the Civil Disobedience Movement and organized the boycott of foreign cloth in Delhi's Chandni Chowk area.

During the Quit India Movement of 1942, he took part in underground activities and worked alongside nationalist leaders including Aruna Asaf Ali. He was arrested and detained for nearly two years before being acquitted in 1944.

== Association with Sri Aurobindo ==
In 1939, Jauhar visited the Sri Aurobindo Ashram in Pondicherry. The visit marked a turning point in his life and led him toward spiritual pursuits under the guidance of Sri Aurobindo and The Mother. He became a devoted follower and dedicated himself to spreading their teachings.

After India's independence, Jauhar gradually withdrew from active politics and focused on spiritual and educational work. With the blessings of The Mother, he founded the Sri Aurobindo Ashram – Delhi Branch on 12 February 1956.

Jauhar founded The Mother's International School in New Delhi in 1956 and contributed to the establishment of Mirambika Free Progress School in 1982.

== Legacy ==
In 2011, India Post issued a commemorative postage stamp to honour his contribution.

== Death ==
Surendra Nath Jauhar died on 2 September 1986 at the age of 83.
