= The Valley School =

- Bangalore, Karnataka; India

Information
- Type: Private school
- Established: 1978
- Faculty: 30
- Grades: 1–12
- Enrollment: 350
- Campus: Urban
- Website: Official website

For schools of similar names, see Valley School (disambiguation)

The Valley School is a co-educational private day school 20 km south of Bangalore city in India (12.8535°N 77.51°E). The school was founded in 1978 by philosopher Jiddu Krishnamurti. The student population of the school is around 325 from classes 1 to 12 (ages 6 to 17).

== Culture ==
Interactions between teacher and student are informal and based on Jiddu Krishnamurti’s philosophy that "Learning cannot happen when there is fear"(handling fear is also a learning). Freedom with responsibility is emphasized from an early age, and rewards and punishments are kept to a minimum. Students are encouraged to direct their own learning.

== Education and curriculum ==
The lower school is run based on Jiddu Krishnamurti's philosophies, where teachers and students are given freedom and flexibility. At the lower schools, the students are encouraged to think and derive at answers through guidance and correction. Along with a standard curriculum of science and humanities, extra-curricular activities are encouraged. Tests and examinations are kept to a minimum where there are no official "annual exam" till Grade 9. When a student reaches Grade 9 it will be the first time the students writes an exam conducted by the school.

Higher classes follow a standard ICSE curriculum, where they appear for a nationwide public board examination at the end of class 10. Class 12 students appear for the ISC examinations conducted by the same board. The School has had a 100% Pass percentage in both 10th and 12th since the batch of 1999.

The Art Village comprises a large part of learning here, with subjects like pottery, weaving, carpentry and painting coming together to form a holistic programmer.

== Campus ==
The school is set on a 120-acre (0.49 km^{2}) campus with a lake and two artificial ponds, dams, three ancient Banyan trees (over 100 years old), and lightly wooded rolling hills. However, 17-acre (0.069 km^{2}) of land was taken by the forest department of the government with clear notice and now the school campus is 103-acre (0.42 km^{2}). Academic buildings are concentrated around the main school in the eastern section of the campus; the student dormitories, residential quarters, guesthouses and the old "Art Village" was located on the western side. The old Art Village was destroyed and taken by the Forest Department in the year 2008. The New "Art Village" is located and built around the school Amphitheater.

The school had three entrances initially, the first gate being the main entrance to the school building, the second gate gave access to the football field while the third gate gave access to the Study Centre and the residential houses, as well as the Art Village. A stylized Neem Tree – which rests the highest point on the land, is the logo of the school. The school is divided into three divisions- Junior School- classes 1–4, Middle school- classes 5–7, and senior school- classes 8–12.

== Transportation and Housing ==
Most students commute to school by bus. The buses are both privately owned and public BMTC contract buses. The school buses operate on routes in the city, picking up and dropping students off. Car pooling is encouraged. Boarding is compulsory and is standard for classes 11 and higher. Student hostels are located on campus.

== Flora and fauna ==
The school is a spot for regular outings of the Birdwatchers' Field Club of Bangalore. About 250 species of birds have been recorded on campus and in adjoining areas. Other creatures seen are fifteen species of mammals including deer, wild boar and elephants, resident leopards, and twenty species of snakes, of which five are venomous. The students learn about the importance of nature and are taught to coexist with it.

== Study Center ==
The campus includes a Study Center that provides accommodation for visitors. The library contains a collection of books and recordings of J. Krishnamurti's talks and dialogues. The center operates without a fixed schedule, allowing individuals to read, view archival materials, or use the quiet spaces. Structured retreats, gatherings, and educational seminars are held at the site throughout the year.

Jiddu Krishnamurti's 125 birth anniversary was celebrated with an exhibition curated by Miti Desai on March 16 and 17, 2020. Jiddu Krishnamurti's contemplations on life, death, education, fear were presented innovatively with installations utilising trees, staircases, rooms.

== First Sunday Meeting ==
On the first Sunday of month (except during School's summer vacation), a gathering of people interested in Krishnamurti is held in the school campus. The school arranges a bus to the city to pick up and drop off participants. After a brief explanation of day's topic, attendees are divided into small groups, for discussion on the topic. The meeting ends with a lunch hosted by the School. A temporary book exhibition is held adjacent to the gathering for people to purchase books, DVDs and other materials.

== Sister schools ==
India

- Bal-Anand
- Pathashaala KFI
- Rajghat Besant School
- Rishi Valley School
- Sahyadri School
- The School KFI

United Kingdom

- Brockwood Park

United States of America

- The Oak Grove School

== See also ==
- Jiddu Krishnamurti
- Jiddu Krishnamurti Schools
- Rishi Valley School
- Walden's Path, Hyderabad
- Vidyaranya High School
- List of schools in India
