= Anjan Sundaram =

Indian author and journalist

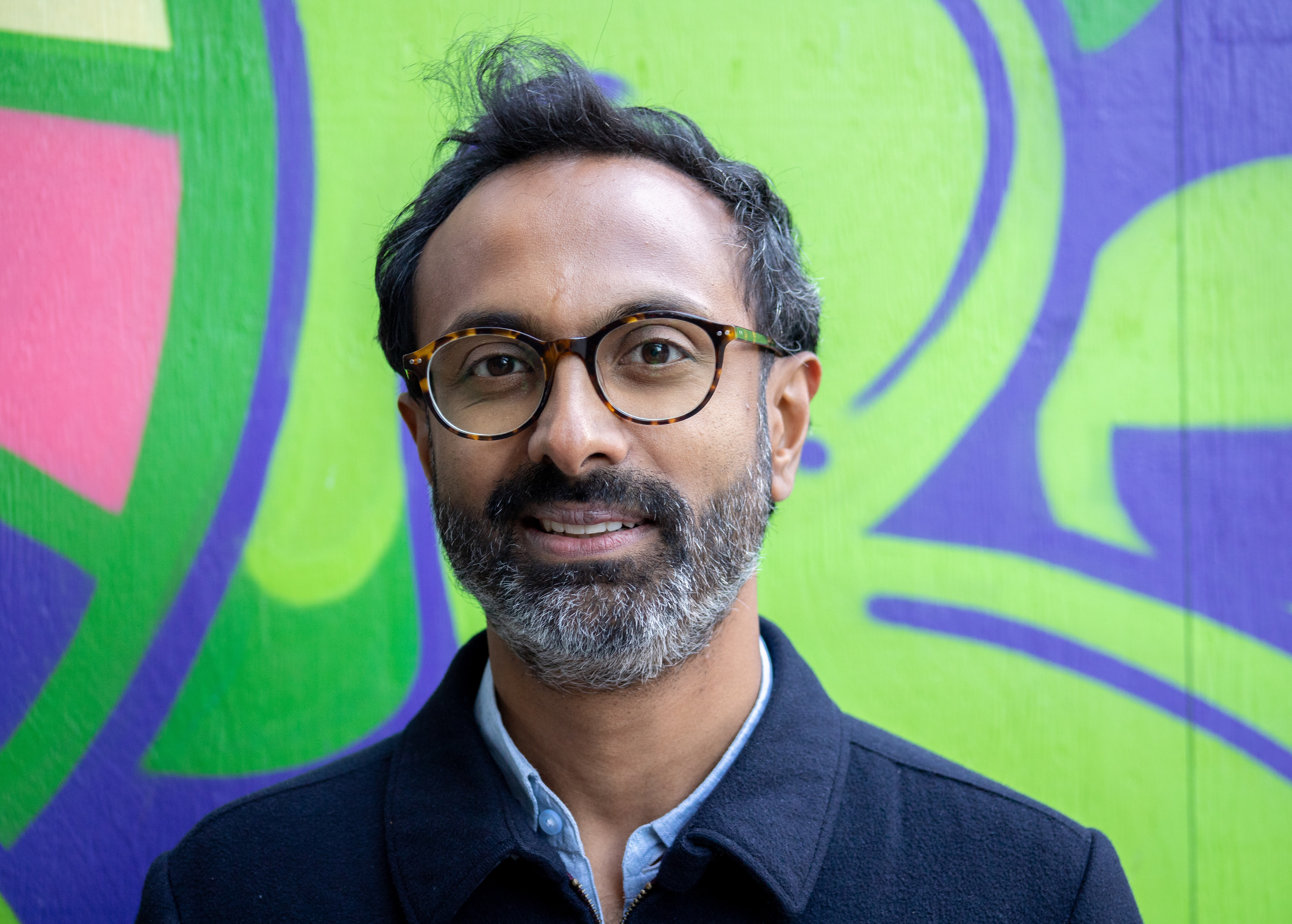
Anjan Sundaram at the 2025 Oslo Freedom Forum

Anjan Sundaram is an Indian author, journalist, academic, and television presenter. He is the author of three memoirs of journalism — Stringer, Bad News and Breakup — and has been called "one of the great reporters of our age" by the BBC special correspondent Fergal Keane. He founded The Stringer Foundation to recognize and support courageous journalists.

== Early life and education ==
Sundaram was born in Ranchi, India, and grew up in Dubai. He studied at Rishi Valley School in India, and was awarded a gold medal in the Indian Physics Olympiad in 2000. After enrolling in the electrical engineering program at the Indian Institute of Technology Madras, he moved to the United States and graduated from Yale University in 2005. Sundaram earned a master's degree in mathematics as an undergraduate at Yale, studying abstract algebra under celebrated mathematician and activist Serge Lang.

== Career ==
He then turned down a job as a mathematician at Goldman Sachs, and began to write, reporting as a stringer for The New York Times and The Associated Press from the Democratic Republic of Congo and Rwanda. He taught journalism in 2016 at Brockwood Park, a school founded by Jiddu Krishnamurti. In 2018, he obtained a PhD in journalism from the University of East Anglia, studying under British author Giles Foden.

=== Stringer: A Reporter's Journey in the Congo ===
Sundaram's 2013 debut Stringer: A Reporter's Journey in the Congo earned him comparisons to Ryszard Kapuściński and Nobel laureate V. S. Naipaul. Stringer was published by Sonny Mehta, the legendary editor of Kapuściński, Naipaul and several Nobel laureates, and was featured on The Daily Show with Jon Stewart, who called the book "remarkable". It was also a Royal African Society book of the year and a BBC book of the week. A feature of Sundaram's writing is his immersive portrayal of what it feels like to be in a place.

=== Bad News: Last Journalists in a Dictatorship ===
Bad News: Last Journalists in a Dictatorship, about the rise of dictatorship in Rwanda, was published in January 2016 and named an Amazon book of the year. It also won the Moore prize and Ingabire prize, and was a finalist for the PEN/America nonfiction prize. Sundaram received threats to his life during the publication of Bad News, for which he was protected by the New York Police Department and Scotland Yard. Noam Chomsky praised Bad News for providing "insights about the human condition that reach far beyond the tragic story of Rwanda." Christiane Amanpour interviewed Anjan about the book in 2020.

Bad News documents the persecution of journalists in Rwanda, including a non-exhaustive appendix of Rwandan journalists, many of whom were killed, disappeared, arrested, or forced into exile. The Guardian called it "an important book that should shatter any lingering faith people might hold in Kagame's hideous regime" and the Washington Post described it as "courageous and heartfelt."

=== Breakup: A Marriage in Wartime ===
Sundaram's third memoir explores the effects of his war reporting on his family. The Washington Post listed it as one of the most-anticipated books of 2023 for its reporting "on the global and the personal," while Time magazine named it a best book of April 2023. Amy Goodman invited Sundaram on Democracy Now to explain "why the world's deadliest conflicts go unreported." The Pulitzer-winning novelist Junot Díaz wrote that Breakup "recalls the best of Michael Herr and V.S. Naipaul but with humanity that steals one’s breath away."

Baillie Gifford Prize-winning lawyer Philippe Sands called Breakup "immensely powerful," and Booker-finalist Sunjeev Sahota called Sundaram "an astonishing writer." The LA Review of Books compared Sundaram to the Nobel laureate William Faulkner. Fergal Keane said of Sundaram: "He writes with exceptional courage and deep humanity. An inspiring chronicler of the world and the spirit."

=== Awards ===
Sundaram was awarded the inaugural World Liberty Congress prize for outstanding journalism in 2025. His award citation read: "The recipient has shown unwavering dedication to uncovering truth, often under difficult or dangerous circumstances. Their reporting challenges impunity, informs the world, and inspires action. This year’s recipient has reported from the frontlines of repression and conflict, documenting the human cost of authoritarian rule. Through his books and on-the-ground journalism, he has exposed censorship, corruption, and violence in places where silence is enforced by fear. His work has amplified voices that regimes have tried to erase, and reminded the world that journalism is not just storytelling — it is a form of resistance."

In 2015, a jury of journalists including Jon Lee Anderson and Carlotta Gall awarded Sundaram the annual Frontline Club prize for his war reporting from the Central African Republic, calling his story A Place on Earth "an excellent, highly original piece of reportage and writing, reminiscent of Ryzard Kapuściński and V.S. Naipaul at their best." Sundaram also received a Reuters environmental journalism prize in 2006 for his reporting from the Democratic Republic of Congo.

=== Television ===
Sundaram hosted a four-part television series called Coded World in 2019, which explores how algorithms and artificial intelligence are changing humans. The series combines Sundaram's expertise in mathematics and journalism.

He also presented a four-part series in 2016 called Deciphering India with Anjan Sundaram, which explores the contentious rise of nationalism in India. The episodes were titled "Godmen", "The Sacred Cow", "The Great Indian Male" and "Identity".

=== Talks ===
His MainStage TED talk in 2024 is titled Meet our planet's hidden defenders, about indigenous environmental defenders fighting drone wars and legal battles to protect some of the world's last pristine ecosystems. His previous TED Talk, in 2017, titled Why I risked my life to expose a government massacre, is about his reporting on remote conflicts. In 2016 he gave a talk called Detecting a Dictatorship at the Oslo Freedom Forum, about journalists who confronted Rwanda's authoritarian government.

== Personal life ==
He was married to the French-Canadian journalist and author, Nathalie Blaquiere, for nearly a decade, before they divorced in 2017. They have a daughter. He describes his marriage and divorce, along with his war correspondence, in his book Breakup: A Marriage in Wartime. His mother is the journalist and actress Vasanti Sundaram.
