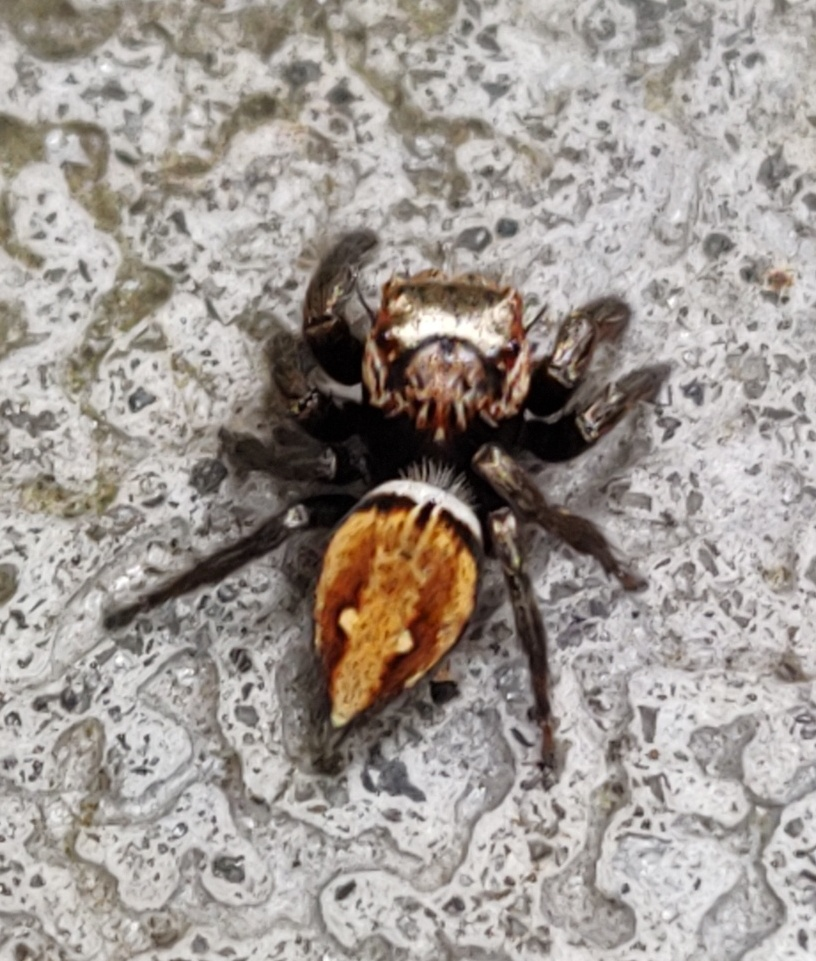
- T. manu
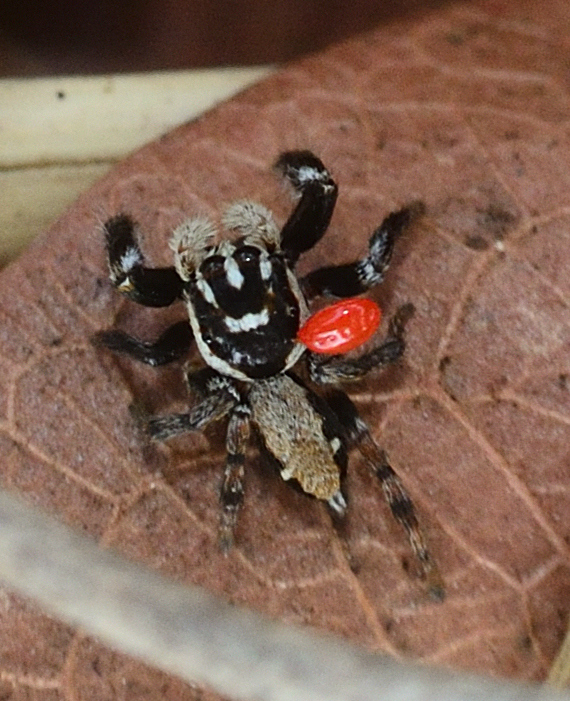
- T. arkavathi

Scientific classification
- Kingdom: Animalia
- Phylum: Arthropoda
- Subphylum: Chelicerata
- Class: Arachnida
- Order: Araneae
- Infraorder: Araneomorphae
- Family: Salticidae
- Subfamily: Salticinae
- Genus: Tenkana; Marathe, Maddison & Caleb, 2024

Type species
- Tenkana manu (Caleb, Christudhas, Laltanpuii & Chitra, 2014)

Species
- 3, see text.

= Tenkana =

Genus of spiders

Tenkana is a genus of the spider family Salticidae (jumping spiders). It was created in 2024 with three species.

Tenkana jayamangali is reported on dry leaf litter on the ground from Tamil Nadu, Puducherry, Karnataka, Telangana and Andhra Pradesh, in southern India.

The species Colopsus arkavathi and C. manu are now included under the newly established genus Tenkana as T. arkavathi and T. manu. The genus name Tenkana comes from Kannada, and means south indicating all the known species are from southern India and northern Sri Lanka.

== Species ==
As of January 2026, this genus includes three species:

- Tenkana arkavathi (Caleb, 2022) – India
- Tenkana jayamangali Caleb & Marathe, 2024 – India
- Tenkana manu (Caleb, Christudhas, Laltanpuii & Chitra, 2014) – India, Sri Lanka
