= David Horsburgh =

British educationist

- Founder of Neel Bagh
- Born: David Michael Horsburgh; England
- Died: Karnataka
- Education: SOAS
- Known for: Educational Reform in India, Neel Bagh School
- Spouse: Doreen Horsburgh
- Children: 3

David Michael Horsburgh (1923–1984) was a British-born educationist who worked in India. He first came to India in 1943 while serving with the Royal Air Force. He felt very much at home in the region and was moved by the poverty and poor educational opportunities for rural children he encountered while living in a small village in the North East. After the war, on his return to the UK he vowed to return to India and become involved in education. He studied in England at the University of London - SOAS (School of Oriental and African Studies) and returned to India to work as a teacher of English, first in Mysore and then at Rishi Valley School. He also worked with the British Council in India and the National Council of Educational Research and Training. He later founded a school, Neel Bagh in Kolar district - about 100 km outside Bangalore. He is known for his contributions to the area of educational reform, especially the introduction of activity-based learning.

== Activity-based learning ==
David Horsburgh introduced a variety of learning approaches and these creative methods involved taking part in a range of activities. Along with his wife Doreen, son Nicholas and daughter-in-law Penny, David Horsburgh developed a diverse curriculum, which included art, handicrafts, music, carpentry, pottery, sewing, masonry, gardening, philosophy as well as the usual school subjects, English, science, mathematics, Sanskrit, Hindi, Kannada and Telugu. These pedagogic materials were systematically planned, with sketches and drawings and an occasional touch of humour. David Horsburgh also built up a magnificent library in Neel Bagh that was accessible to both teachers and students. In modern times this approach to education has been followed in the Corporation schools of Chennai, from 2003, as an effort to provide special schools for children who had been freed from bonded labour.

David Horsburgh was a man of many talents - carpenter, poet, author, educationalist, teacher, classic car enthusiast, artist and linguist. He had many friends and was known for being gregarious, overly generous and full of ideas and pranks. In order to fund the school, and latterly a free dispensary run by his wife and daughter-in-law, he wrote educational text books for India, published by Oxford University Press. His ideas and methodology around teaching practice were highly regarded by many. After his death in 1984, his son Nicholas took over running Neel Bagh school.

== Documentary film ==
In 2022 independent education filmmaker Sourav Dutta came up with a documentary film on David Horsburgh and his efforts around his school Neel Bagh. After 50 years the story of David and his school was finally captured on camera. The efforts around the production of the film was made possible by crowdfunding and many volunteers who came together and donated their skill towards the making of the film. The documentary film named 'David and his Neel Bagh' was realised on 14 January 2022, on Project Nomad YouTube channel under Creative Commons 4.0 license. Prateek Srivastava, who volunteered as a cinematographer for the project, caught the documentary's beautiful visuals.
