= The School KFI =

- Chennai, Tamil Nadu; India

Information
- Type: Private school
- Established: 1973
- Founder: Jiddu Krishnamurti
- Sister school: Rajghat Besant School; Oak Grove School (Ojai, California); The Valley School; Sahyadri School; Brockwood Park School; Pathashaala KFI
- Faculty: 35
- Gender: Co-educational
- Enrollment: 350
- Affiliation: ICSE; ISC
- Website: www.theschoolkfi.org

The School KFI is a school situated in Chennai. It was started in the year 1973. It is run by the Krishnamurti Foundation India (KFI) based on the views on education and philosophy of J. Krishnamurti. The school has about 350 students and 35 teachers.

Until May 2018, the school was located in a spacious campus in Adyar made available by the Theosophical Society. The School KFI relocated to a new campus in June 2018 to Thazhambur (off Old Mahabalipuram Road).

== See also ==
- Jiddu Krishnamurti Schools
- Alternative School
- Krishnamurti Foundation
- Rishi Valley School
- Rajghat Besant School
- The Valley School
