= Riwaayat =

- Genre: Hindustani classical
- Location: Hyderabad
- Years active: 2010–present
- Website: http://riwaayat.in/index.htm

Riwaayat, earlier Riwaayat-e-Maihar, is a classical music event which sticks to the classical form of rendition. The group belongs to Maihar gharana. The event features fine artistes who still practice the traditional way of rendering music.

== History ==
Riwaayat, meaning "Tradition" in Urdu, started in 2010 in Hyderabad at Hyderabad Central University, S.N. School of Performing Arts & Communication.

== 2012 events ==
- Manjusha Kulkarni-Patil (Hindustani vocal) – 24 February 2012

== 2011 event ==
The event was held on 9 and 10 December 2011 at Vidyaranya High School, Hyderabad

- Jayateerth Mevundi (vocal) – Kirana gharana
- Sanhita Nandi (vocal) – Kirana gharana

== 2010 event ==
- Suresh Vyas (Sarod)
- Basant Kabra (Sarod)
- Dr. Angara.V.Raja (Sitar)
- Pt. Nityanad Haldipur
