= Vidyaranya High School =

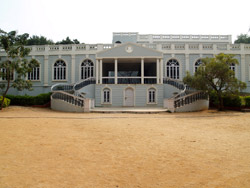
- VHS New Building

Location
- Green Gates, Saifabad; Hyderabad, Telangana; India; 17.404°N 78.466°E

Information
- Type: Private school
- Established: 1961; 65 years ago
- Founder: Mrs. Shanta Rameshwar Rao
- Grades: K-10
- Enrolment: 700-1000
- Website: www.vidyaranyaschool.com

Vidyaranya High School for Boys and Girls is a high school in Hyderabad, Telangana, India.

== Foundation ==
Vidyaranya High School was established in 1961 in Hyderabad, India by its founder Shanta Rameswar Rao, located at the foot of Naubath Pahad. According to the school, its underlying philosophy is derived in part from the teachings of Jiddu Krishnamurti, and a reason the school is special is that "the teachers are as open to learning as are the children".

While the ICSE based syllabus is followed in the higher classes, the school functions with a unique ideology. The competition is deemphasized, in an unconventional teaching format "beyond a syllabus and examinations", which are administered from class VIII and upwards. There are no exams until class VIII. There is no prescribed uniform for the students; children are taught to dress appropriately. Although Vidyaranya is an English-medium school, great importance is given to Indian languages, Indian music and culture as well as English literature, Indian History, literature, Western music (singing), multi-cultural activities, crafts, student plays, and sports. Students are encouraged to learn and play by questioning and thinking—all of this in a spirit of cooperation and compassion rather than competition.

== Admissions ==
Vidyaranya High School original main building. Photo: 09-24-1984

The admission process requires that parent(s) attend an interview, which is more in the nature of a free-wheeling discussion.

== Examinations ==
Examinations are administered from standard level VIII. Regular assignments and co-operative study promote learning. Quarterly reports are given to all students and parent-teacher meetings are held to enable parents and teachers to interact.

== Media and events ==
Several organizations regularly host events at the school:

- Manthan: Forum for Public Discourse
- The cultural organisation Riwaayat
- Spic Macay
- The Goethe-Zentrum, Hyderabad

== Notable alumni ==
- Jr. NTR - Actor, dancer and singer
- Dia Mirza - Actress, model and Miss Asia Pacific 2000.
- Tara D'Souza - Actress and model
- G. V. Prasad - Ceo of Dr Reddy's labs

== See also ==
- Rishi Valley School
- Rajghat Besant School
- The Valley School
- Walden's Path
