= Krishnamurti foundations =

Nonprofit organizations

- Named after: Jiddu Krishnamurti
- Predecessor: Krishnamurti Writings Inc
- Established: 1968; 58 years ago
- Founder: Jiddu Krishnamurti
- Type: Nonprofit
- Website: www.jkrishnamurti.org

The Krishnamurti foundations are a set of nonprofit organisations established to preserve and disseminate the work of 20th-century Indian philosopher Jiddu Krishnamurti (1895–1986). The foundations, established in the late-1960s to mid-1970s by Krishnamurti and associates, are located in India, Spain, the United Kingdom and the United States. They transcribe and distribute his thousands of talks, discussions and writings in various media formats and several languages; and maintain archives of original material covering Krishnamurti's almost eight-decade presence on the public stage. They also organize events exploring Krishnamurti's philosophy, and oversee independent schools that were formed to promote and apply his views on education.

== Description ==
Jiddu Krishnamurti's life and teachings spanned the greater part of the 20th century. The Krishnamurti foundations' stated purpose is to assist those who may be interested in pursuing an understanding of his teachings in their own lives. The foundations maintain extensive archives of his original works in the form of manuscripts and books, audio and video media, and verified transcripts of thousands of talks, discussions, meetings and interviews. There are also collections of Krishnamurti's letters, photographs and reference material about his life and works.

The foundations are actively engaged in the publication and dissemination of this material in various forms. As of July 2026 over 60 books were in print. About 600 videos and 400 audios are available online, along with extensive indexes. An increasing amount of this material is translated in over 50 languages, including all major European and most Indian languages as well as Japanese, Cantonese, Mandarin, Russian, Korean and Hebrew.

== Foundations ==
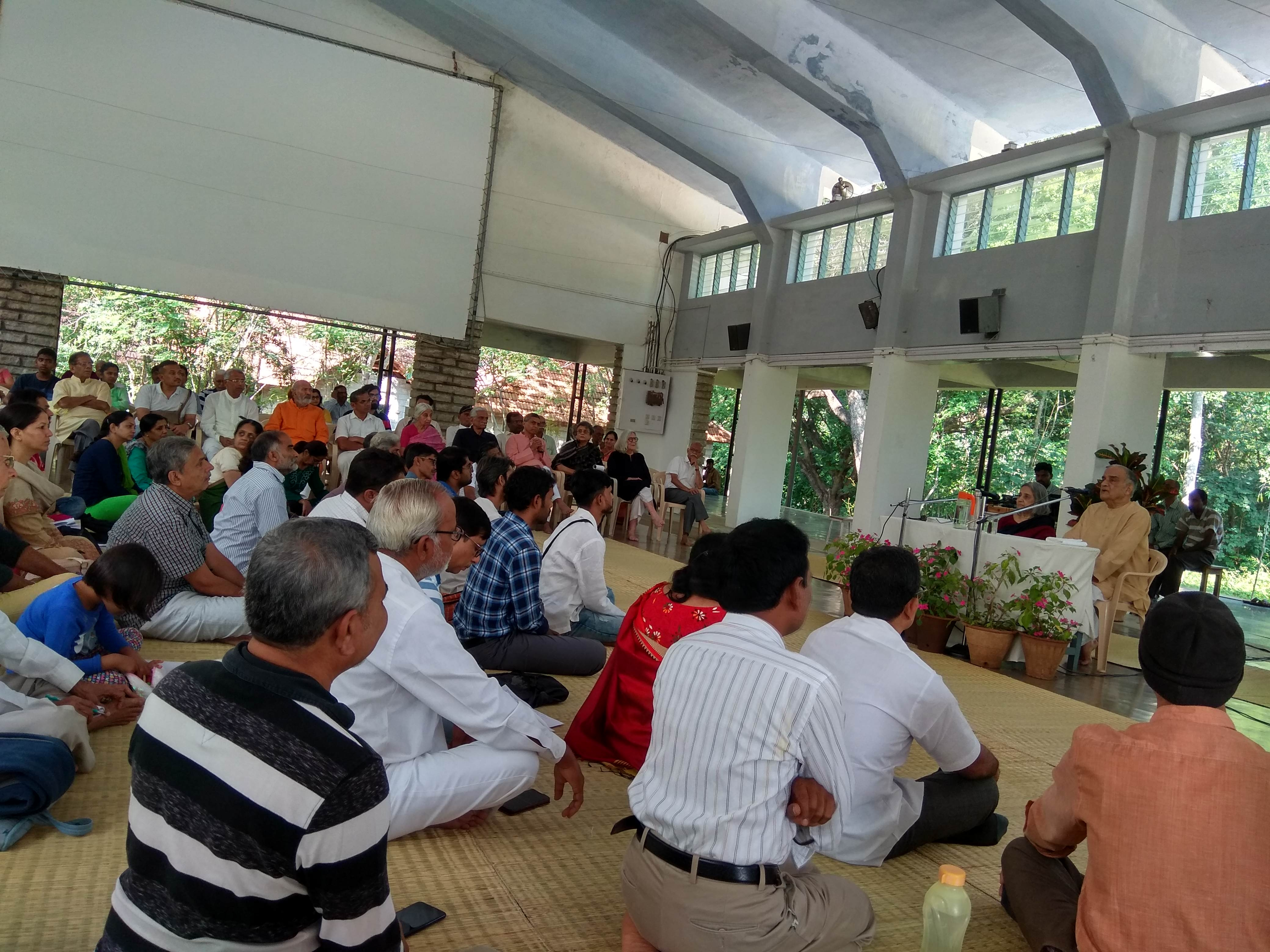
Krishnamurti Foundation India Retreat at Rishi Valley

- Krishnamurti Foundation Trust, Brockwood Park, Bramdean, England
- Krishnamurti Foundation of America, Ojai, California
- Krishnamurti Foundation India, Chennai
- Fundación Krishnamurti Latinoamericana, Barcelona, Spain

== Educational philosophy ==
Education was a central theme in Krishnamurti's exposition. He considered right education the agent of both personal renewal and societal change, and with supporters founded several schools around the world as experiments in alternative, holistic education. He insisted that schools functioning under the auspices of the Krishnamurti foundations and others started independently by his supporters, should not indoctrinate children, but be places where students and teachers can flower, thereby affecting society at large.

Krishnamurti enumerated the following as his educational aims:

1. Global outlook: A vision of the whole as distinct from the part; there should never be a sectarian outlook, but always a holistic outlook free from all prejudice.
2. Concern for man and the environment: Humanity is part of nature, and if nature is not cared for, it will boomerang on man. Only the right education and deep affection between people everywhere will resolve many problems including the environmental challenges.
3. Religious spirit, which includes the scientific temper: The religious mind is alone, not lonely. It is in communion with people and nature.

== Foundation schools ==
- Brockwood Park School, United Kingdom
- Oak Grove School, United States
- Pathashaala KFI, Tamil Nadu, India
- Rishi Valley School, Andhra Pradesh, India
- Rajghat Besant School, Varanasi, India
- Sahyadri School, Pune, India
- The School KFI, Chennai, India
- The Valley School, Bengaluru, India

== Study centres ==
- Krishnamurti Study Centre, Brockwood Park, United Kingdom
- Pepper Tree Retreat, Ojai, California, United States
- KFI Cuttack Centre, India
- KFI Mumbai, India
- Krishnamurti Centre, Kolkata, India
- Krishnamurti Retreat in the Himalayas, Uttarkashi, India
- Krishnamurti Study Centre Sahyadri, Pune, India
- Rajghat Education Center, Rajghat Fort, India
- The Study, Valley School Campus, Bangalore, Índia
- Krishnamurti Center, Colombo, Sri Lanka
- Krishnamurti Study Center, Baddagana Road, Sri Lanka
