= Bramdean and Hinton Ampner =

Civil parish in Hampshire, England

Coordinates: 51°02′53″N 1°07′41″W

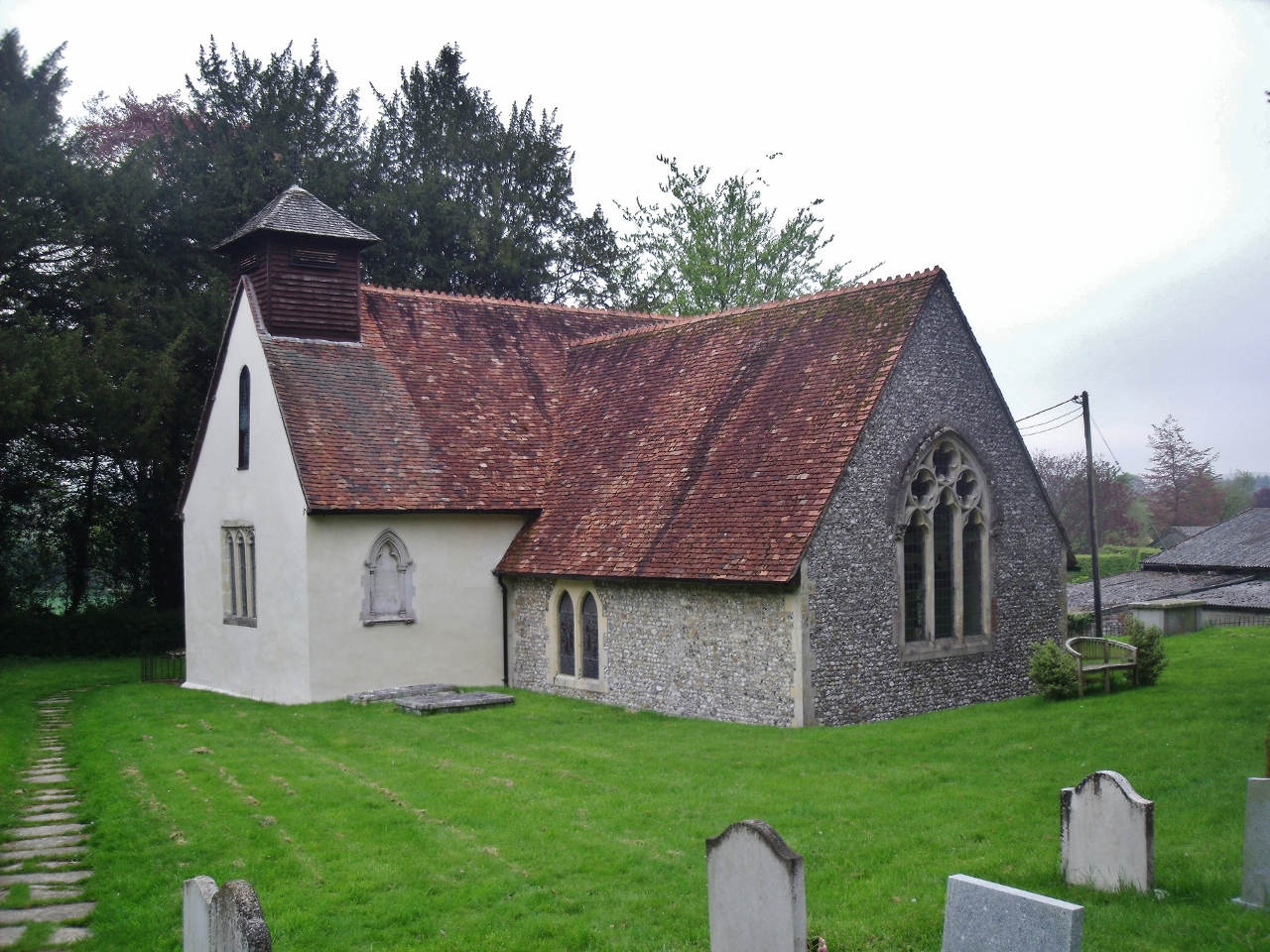
- Bramdean church

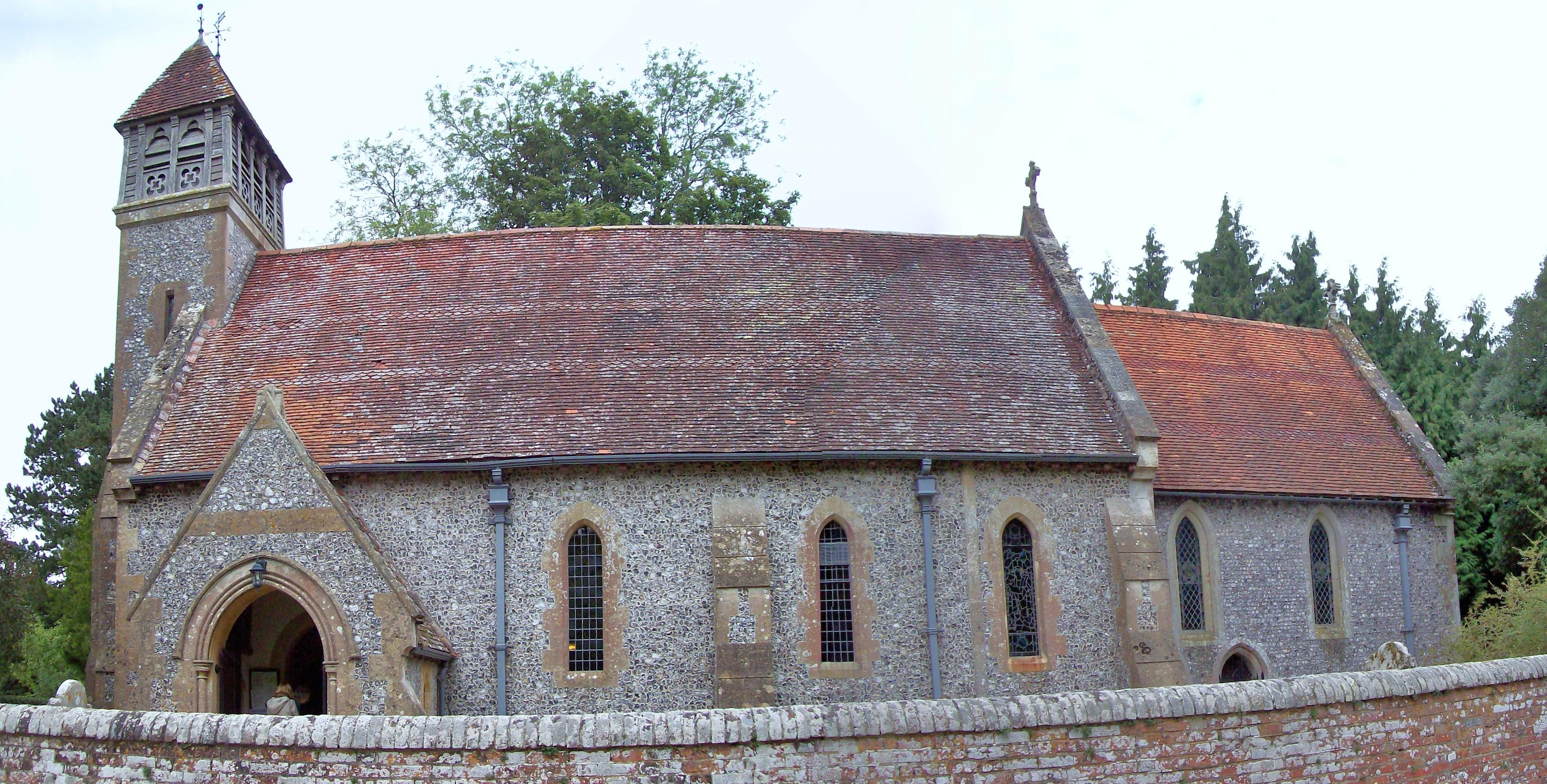
- Hinton Ampner church

- Location within Hampshire
- Population: 629 (2011 Census)
- OS grid reference: SU6124428033
- District: Winchester
- Shire county: Hampshire
- Region: South East
- Country: England
- Sovereign state: United Kingdom
- Post town: ALRESFORD
- Postcode district: SO24
- Dialling code: 01962
- Police: Hampshire and Isle of Wight
- Fire: Hampshire and Isle of Wight
- Ambulance: South Central
- UK Parliament: Winchester

Bramdean and Hinton Ampner is a civil parish in the English county of Hampshire, forming part of the area administered as the City of Winchester. Its main settlements are the villages of Bramdean and Hinton Ampner. In 2011 it had a population of 629.

== Wolfhanger ==
Wolfhanger is a hamlet in Bramdean and Hinton Ampner situated approximately 1.5 miles (2.4 km) northeast of Bramdean. Wolfhanger was predominantly formed in 1937, following the development of a poultry farm. Three cottages had already existed here, which date from the 1830s and stand prominently on a junction known as Woodland Gate. This junction is also known as Hells Bottom, as it is believed that this area was the location of the gibbet for the former parishes of Bramdean and Hinton Ampner.

The name of Wolfhanger is derived from a nearby field of the same name, said to be where the last wolf in Hampshire was killed. The name existed in the late 18th century when the name of Wolfhanger Wood was recorded.

In the 1960s, Wolfhanger became the home of writer and newsreader Terence Carroll.
