= Rajghat Besant School =

Coordinates: 25.3277°N 83.0356°E

Location
- Varanasi, Uttar Pradesh; India

Information
- Type: Private boarding school
- Founder: Jiddu Krishnamurti
- Grades: 2–12
- Gender: Co-educational
- Enrollment: ~400
- Affiliation: CBSE
- Website: rajghatbesantschool.org

Rajghat Besant School (or RBS) in Varanasi is the second oldest school of Krishnnamurti Foundation India and one of the resident-cum-day schools of India, established in 1934 by Jiddu Krishnamurti. It is named after Annie Besant and located near the Kashi Railway Station on the banks of river Ganges.

The school was founded and is run by Krishnamurti Foundation. The Krishnamurti Foundation India was originally established in 1928 as a charitable institution, by J. Krishnamurti and Annie Besant.

Rajghat Besant School is a residential, co-educational, English medium school affiliated to the CBSE Board, New Delhi. The school is spread over 400 acres of a sprawling campus, stretching across both banks of the Varuna. It consists of the many units of the Rajghat Education Centre–the Rajghat Besant School (RBS), the Vasanta College for Girls, Vasantashram, and the Krishnamurti Study Centre/Retreat. Across the Varuna, the Rural Centre has the Sanjivan Hospital, a free primary health centre, the Rural Primary School for students from surrounding villages, a dairy, and an agricultural farm. Rajghat School is known for its joyful and stress free environment of education.

The assembly hall, which has a special significance amongst all the school buildings, was designed by architect Surendranath Kar, a friend of Rabindranath Tagore, whom Tagore himself sent to Rajghat. It was inaugurated on Basant Panchami day by Tagore. Distinguished figures such as the Dalai Lama have visited and continue to visit the school.

The school curriculum incorporates social, cultural and extra curricular activities: regular SPIC-MACAY programs are organised on campus, exposing students to cross cultural traditions in music and inculcating appreciation in them. The Annual Sports Day is usually organised in the last week of December. In 1953, Achyut Patwardhan, a close associate of J. Krishnamurti, and a friend of Mahatma Gandhi further expanded the area adjoining the school and founded the Rajghat Rural Centre, which houses two rural schools - one for boys, and the other for girls, in the Village Saraimohana; it also has a hospital, a vocational training institute for women and a farm, which offers its services free of cost, all run by the Krishnamurti Foundation Trust.

== See also ==
- List of educational institutions in Varanasi
- Rishi Valley School, Madanapalle
- The Valley School, Bangalore
- Walden's Path, Hyderabad
- Vidyaranya High School, Hyderabad
