= Brockwood Park =

Coordinates: 51°02′02″N 1°06′31″W

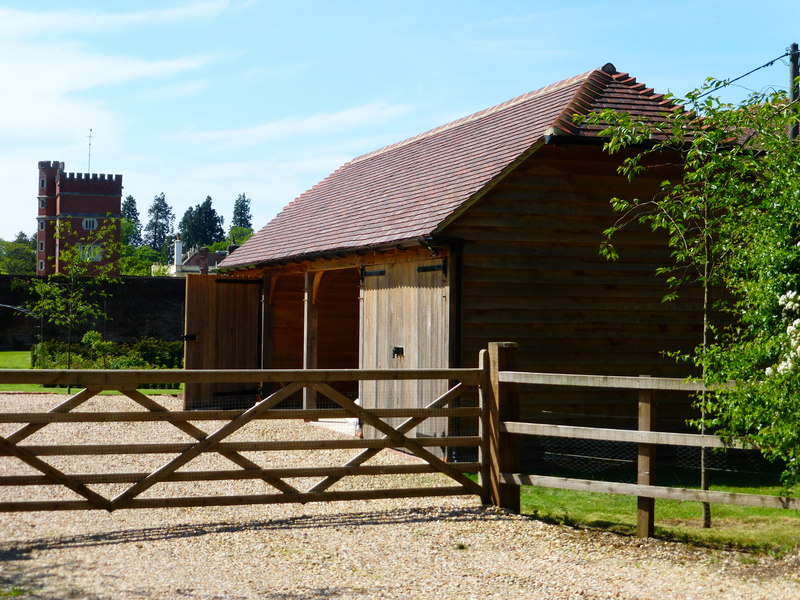
- Tower at Brockwood Park School

- Location within Hampshire
- OS grid reference: SU6226
- Civil parish: Bramdean and Hinton Ampner
- District: Winchester
- Shire county: Hampshire
- Region: South East
- Country: England
- Sovereign state: United Kingdom
- Post town: Alresford
- Postcode district: SO24
- Dialling code: 01962
- Police: Hampshire and Isle of Wight
- Fire: Hampshire and Isle of Wight
- Ambulance: South Central
- UK Parliament: Winchester

Brockwood Park is a country estate located in the civil parish of Bramdean and Hinton Ampner, in the Winchester district, in the county of Hampshire, England. Historically, it was situated in the now reformed parish of Bramdean. There is a Krishnamurti school on the grounds of the estate known as Brockwood Park School, and The Krishnamurti Centre, a retreat centre.

== History ==
The house at the centre of the estate and school is a lofty stuccoed building, with the central block dating back to 1769. Originally a red brick house in Flemish bond, the mansion was extended during the ownership of the 1st Earl of Malmesbury, and “painted white”. The west wing of the house is part of this early work, and the present library and bow bay window form the earliest section. The house was later extended in all directions, with an extensive ancillary wing, entrance hall and dining room with a suite of rooms on the first floor. An extensive walled garden was also erected, probably sometime between 1807 and 1880, and a water tower built in 1912, by Daniel Coats of Coats Cotton Manufacturers.

The site of the house at Brockwood Park is understood to have been a held as a copyhold estate under the manor of Hinton Ampner. At that time, Brockwood was called Lye Farm, and sat chiefly situated above the surrounding valley. The immediate surrounding land was known as Lye Park, and also Lye Common. The estate has had various names over the centuries, including "Lye Farm", "“Brookwood" and finally "Brockwood". The name of Brookwood was taken from a nearby woodland of the same name, and later the name was changed to Brockwood, due to a famed postal mistake with Brookwood in Surrey. The estate as a whole was sold in the late 1960s to the Morton family, who at that time lived at Woodcote Manor. The house at Brockwood was later split from the estate in 1969, along with the formal gardens and a small portion of the original parkland.

== Notable features ==
The estate is notable for its extensive avenues of copper beech trees, which were predominantly planted by Colonel George Greenwood (d.1875). The older trees which still survive were all grown by Greenwood from seed, and were often planted on and within the boundaries of the estate. A number of giant sequoias grow in the former estate grounds.

A stone circle was erected on the estate grounds in the mid-19th century by Colonel George Greenwood, made primarily from local Sarsen stones dug up at East Tisted in addition to some Puddingstones from Farringdon in memory to his horse Whimsey, who is buried at the foot of the hill to Brockwood. Brockwood Park House is a Grade II listed building, listed on 5 December 1955.

== Brockwood Park School ==
Brockwood Park School is an independent school located on the grounds of the former park which was inspired by the teachings of Jiddu Krishnamurti. The school was founded in 1969 and located in the mansion, which was restored for the purposes of the school. Krishnamurti resided at the school and gave talks freely open to the public until 1985 when he left due to health concerns.

Krishnamurti's main object in starting schools such as the Brockwood Park School was to give children a chance to grow up without any racial, religious, class or cultural prejudices.

== Other ==
A vegetarian cookbook was written in 2001 on the dishes served at the Krishnamurti school known as the "Brockwood vegetarian cookbook".
