= Colopsus =

Scientific classification
- Kingdom: Animalia
- Phylum: Arthropoda
- Subphylum: Chelicerata
- Class: Arachnida
- Order: Araneae
- Infraorder: Araneomorphae
- Family: Salticidae
- Genus: Colopsus; Simon, 1902

Type species
- C. cancellatus Simon, 1902

Species
- 5, see text.

Genus of jumping spiders

Colopsus is a genus of Asian jumping spiders first described by Eugène Louis Simon in 1902. It was synonymized with Evarcha in 1984, but the name was revalidated in 2021. It is a senior synonym of Cheliceroides.

== Species ==
As of November 2024, the World Spider Catalog accepted five species:

- C. cancellatus Simon, 1902 (type) – Sri Lanka
- C. ferruginus Kanesharatnam & Benjamin, 2021 – Sri Lanka
- C. magnus Kanesharatnam & Benjamin, 2021 – Sri Lanka
- C. peppara Sudhin, Sen & Caleb, 2023 – India
- C. tenuesi Kanesharatnam & Benjamin, 2021 – Sri Lanka

== See also ==
- Evarcha
- List of Salticidae genera
