= Oak Grove School (Ojai, California) =

Location
- 220 West Lomita Avenue; Ojai, California 93023; United States; 34.4418°N 119.2811°W

Information
- Type: Private, day and boarding school
- Established: 1975
- Founder: Jiddu Krishnamurti
- Oversight: Krishnamurti Foundation of America
- NCES School ID: 00083622
- Head of school: Jodi Grass
- Staff: 92
- Grades: PK–12
- Gender: Co-educational
- Enrollment: 240
- Student to teacher ratio: 7.4
- Campus size: 150 acres
- Athletics conference: Condor League
- Mascot: Lizard
- Website: www.oakgroveschool.org

Oak Grove School is a private, co-educational, day and boarding school in Ojai, California, United States. It was established in 1975 by Jiddu Krishnamurti and is part of the Krishnamurti Foundation of America.

Oak Grove School focuses on a holistic "Climate of Inquiry," balancing rigorous academics with self-understanding and critical thinking.
