= Polestar (disambiguation) =

Polestar is an electric vehicle brand.

Pole star, polestar or polar star may also refer to:

- Pole star, a bright star that is approximately aligned with the axis of rotation of a planet
  - Polaris, North Pole star of the Earth
- Polestar, a monument in Letterkenny
- Polestar, the company of Philip Segal
- Polestar, developer of the Japan-exclusive game Magical Pop'n
- Polestar Book Publishers, a literary book publishing division owned by Raincoast
- Polestar Racing Group, an American motorsport team currently competing in the Atlantic Championship
- Polestar Racing, a Swedish motorsport team currently competing in the STCC and V8 SuperCars Championship
- The branding name for the Kita-Osaka Kyuko 8000 series
- Polestar Preschool, an area in the SNES RPG EarthBound
- Polyarnaya Zvezda (disambiguation) (Russian-language titles)
  - Polar Star (Decembrist journal)
  - Polar Star (Herzen)
- Operation Polar Star, World War II Soviet military operation
- Polar Star Couloir, Mount Beluga, Baffin Island
- Polar Star (airplane), an airplane used by Antarctic explorer Lincoln Ellsworth

== Literature and arts ==
- Polestar an the alias of Cosmic Boy, a DC Comics superhero in the Legion of Super-Heroes
- Polestar (comics), a Spider-Man villain
- Polar Star (novel), a 1989 novel by Martin Cruz Smith
- "Polar Star" (song), a song by F.T. Island

== Ships ==
- MS Polstjerna, a former Norwegian sealing ship
- MV Polar Star, a former cruise ship by Polar Star Expeditions
- NLV Pole Star, the name applied to a succession of lighthouse tender vessels
- RV Polarstern, a German research icebreaker
- USCGC Polar Star (WAGB-10), an icebreaker

== See also ==
- Polestar Xeus, a solution for monitoring cloud systems
- Polar (cataclysmic variable star), a type of star
- Order of the Polar Star Swedish order of Chivalry
- Order of the Polar Star (Norway)
- Polaris (disambiguation)
- Dhruva (disambiguation), the polestar in Hinduism
