= Order of the Star =

Order of the Star could refer to:

== Awards and distinctions ==
- Order of the Star of Africa
- Order of the Star of Ghana
- Order of the Star of Jordan
- Order of the Star of Italian Solidarity
- Order of the Star of Romania
- Order of the Star of South Africa
- Order of the African Star
- Order of the Equatorial Star
- Order of the Polar Star (Norway)
- Order of the Red Star
- Order of the White Star
- Order of Karađorđe Star

== Chivalric Orders ==
- Order of the Star (France)
- Order of the Star of Anjouan
- Order of the Star of India
- Order of the Polar Star

== Dynastic Orders ==
- Order of the Star of Ethiopia
- Order of the Star of Sarawak

== Other organizations ==
- Order of the Star in the East
- Order of the Star Spangled Banner
- Order of the Eastern Star
