= Polyarnaya Zvezda (disambiguation) =

Polyarnaya Zvezda (meaning "Polar star" in Russian) was a Russian language literary almanac, published in Saint Petersburg from 1822 to 1825.

Polyarnaya Zvezda may also refer to:

- Polar Bear (schooner), a ship known as the Polyarnaya Zvezda after its purchase by the Soviet Union in 1925.
- Polar Star (Herzen), a magazine published by Alexander Herzen in London, 1855-1868
- Polar Star (Yakutia), a literary magazine in Yakutia, Russia

== See also ==
- Polestar (disambiguation)
