= Order of the Polar Star (disambiguation) =

The Order of the Polar Star is a national award in many nations, namely the following:

- Order of the Polar Star (Sweden)
- Order of the Polar Star (Norway)
- Order of the Polar Star (Mongolia)
- Order of the Polar Star (Yakutia)

== See also ==
- Order of the Red Banner
