= Dhuruva Natchathiram =

Dhruva Natchathiram or Dhuruva Natchathiram are regional variations of Dhruva Nakshatra, the Sanskrit name of the pole star, and may refer to:

- Dhruva Nakshatram (1989 film), Telugu film
- Dhuruva Natchathiram (1993 film), Tamil film
- Dhruva Natchathiram (upcoming film), Tamil film
  - Dhruva Natchathiram (soundtrack) of the upcoming film

== See also ==
- Dhruva (disambiguation)
