= Besant Hill School =

Private school in Ojai, California, United States

Besant School of Happy Valley

Location
- Ojai, CA; United States; 34.4395°N 119.1860°W

Information
- Type: Private, Boarding, Day
- Established: 1946
- Head of school: Portia Johnson
- Faculty: 26
- Enrollment: 104 (90% Boarding)
- Average class size: 9 students
- Student to teacher ratio: 4:1
- Campus size: 520 acres (2.1 km^{2})
- Colors: Navy Blue and Green
- Mascot: Coyote
- Nickname: Happy Valley, Besant Hill
- Website: www.besanthill.org

Besant Hill School of Happy Valley, formerly the Happy Valley School, is an American private, coeducational boarding school and day school in Ojai, California. Notable subjects are environmental science and sustainability program coupled with a working garden/farm on campus. The school has approximately 100 students and about 35 faculty and staff, all of whom live on or near campus. There were 13 states and 22 countries represented in the 2017–2018 student body.

== History ==
The school was conceptualized by Annie Besant, who had initially envisioned an educational community that would nurture spiritual, artistic, and intellectual growth as well as physical and mental well-being. Initially a secondary school, it was founded by Guido Ferrando, Aldous Huxley, J. Krishnamurti, and Rosalind Rajagopal. The school opened on October 1, 1946, as the Happy Valley School, with Dr. Ferrando serving as the first Head of the School. It sat on 520 acres (210 ha) of land that was bought in 1927 by Besant. It was later renamed in July 2007 in Besant's honor.

== Notable founders/faculty members ==
- Annie Besant – Main Founder of the school, women's rights activist, and president of the theosophical society.
- Rosalind Rajagopal – Main Founder of the school and long-time director.
- Aldous Huxley – Main Founder of the school and author/novelist.
- Jiddu Krishnamurti – Writer on philosophical and spiritual subjects.
- Franklin Lacey – Faculty member, Former Head of School, playwright and screenwriter.
- Beatrice Wood – Faculty member, Avant-garde artist and studio potter.

== Notable alumni ==
- Alex J. Mandl
- Tom Pollock
- Cheryl Crane
