= Dhruva (disambiguation) =

Dhruva or Dhruv is a Sanskrit word meaning firm or unshakeable and commonly refers to a devotee of Vishnu who later became the pole star in Hindu mythology.

Dhruva may also refer to:

== Art and entertainment ==
- Dhruva (2002 film), a 2002 Indian Kannada-language film starring Darshan
- Dhruva (2016 film), a 2016 Indian Telugu-language film by Surender Reddy, starring Ram Charan
  - Dhruva (soundtrack), soundtrack for the 2016 film by Hiphop Tamizha
- Dhruva (band), an Indian music band
- Dhruva Interactive, a video game studio in India
- Super Commando Dhruva, an Indian comic book superhero

== People ==
- Dhruva Dharavarsha, a medieval Rashtrakuta king of India
- Dhruva Sarja, Indian actor
- Dhruv (singer) (born 1999), British singer-songwriter
- Dhruv Jurel (born 2001), Indian cricketer
- Dhruv Pandove (1974–1992), Indian cricketer
- Dhruv Rathee (born 1994), Indian YouTuber
- Dhruv Sehgal (born 1990), Indian actor
- Dhruv Sharma (1982–2017), Indian actor and cricketer
- Dhruv Vikram (born 1997), Indian actor
- Anandshankar Dhruv (1869–1942), Indian writer

== Other ==
- Dhruva reactor, an Indian nuclear reactor
- Dhruva Space, Indian private aerospace manufacturer
- HAL Dhruv, a multi-role helicopter developed and manufactured by India's Hindustan Aeronautics Limited
- INS Dhruv, a missile range instrumentation ship of the Indian Navy

== See also ==
- Polestar (disambiguation)
- Dhruva Natchathiram (disambiguation)
