= Lives in the Shadow with J. Krishnamurti =

1991 memoir by Radha Rajagopal Sloss

- First edition
- Author: Radha Rajagopal Sloss
- Language: English, French
- Subject: Autobiography
- Published: Bloomsbury Publishing, May 1991 (1st edition); Self-published via iUniverse, August 2011 ("new edition")
- Publication place: United Kingdom, United States
- Media type: Digital (ebook); Print (hardcover, paperback)
- Pages: 320 (1st edition); 368 (2011 edition)
- ISBN: 978-0-747-50720-8 (1st edition)

Lives in the Shadow with J. Krishnamurti is a 1991 memoir by Radha Rajagopal Sloss (1931–2022). It chronicles aspects of the long, intimate, and ultimately contentious relationship of the author's family with the Indian philosopher Jiddu Krishnamurti. Originally published five years after his death, the book's descriptions of certain facets of Krishnamurti's life generated a degree of controversy.

== About the work ==
The author's father Rajagopalacharya Desikacharya (commonly D. Rajagopal, 1900–1993), and mother Rosalind Rajagopal (1903–1996), were friends and associates of Jiddu Krishnamurti (1895–1986) for four decades; throughout this time they lived in close proximity with him in Ojai, California. While growing up the author viewed the unconventional Indian philosopher, whom she affectionately called Krinsh, as a member of her family. Eventually, the personal and business relationships of her parents and Krishnamurti soured permanently. The acrimony culminated in drawn-out legal actions that were fully settled only after Krishnamurti's death.

Radha Rajagopal Sloss covers aspects of these relationships in some detail, but the book is best known for describing facets of Krishnamurti's private life, especially his (reputedly long-term) extramarital affair with the author's mother. Additionally, the book contains statements about Krishnamurti's character and actions that generated controversy.

== Author statement ==
Rajagopal Sloss stated the following regarding the work:

This is not only the story of one person. It is the story of the relationships of J. Krishnamurti and people closely involved with him, especially Rosalind Williams Rajagopal and D. Rajagopal, my mother and father, and of the consequences of this involvement on their lives. Recently there have been biographies and a biographical film on Krishnamurti that have left areas, and a large span of years, in mysterious darkness. It is not in the interest of historical integrity, especially where such a personality is concerned, that there be these areas of obscurity.

— Lives in the Shadow with J. Krishnamurti, Preface

== Publication history ==
The book was originally published in May 1991 by Bloomsbury Publishing in the United Kingdom as a hardcover, with a dust jacket featuring youthful portraits of Krishnamurti and Rosalind Rajagopal. A US edition with an additional preface was published in hardcover by Addison-Wesley in January 1993; it has an alternate cover design featuring a 1934 group photograph of Krishnamurti, Rosalind Rajagopal and the author. The paperback version appeared in March 1994. In September 2000 Rajagopal Sloss re-released the work in paperback through iUniverse, a US self-publishing company.

A "new edition" was released via iUniverse in August 2011 in print and digital media with the US cover design. It adds yet another preface, previously unpublished photographs, and press review excerpts of the 1st edition. This edition was also published in French via the same channel and media in January 2012, with a translation by Francois Swaen.

=== Select editions ===
- Rajagopal Sloss, Radha (January 1993). Lives in the Shadow with J. Krishnamurti (hardcover) (1st US ed.). Reading, Massachusetts: Addison-Wesley. 335 pp. ISBN 978-0-201-63211-8.
- —— (August 2011). Lives in the Shadow with J. Krishnamurti. Self-published – via iUniverse.
  - Ebook (various file formats). ISBN 978-1-4620-3131-3.
  - Paperback. 368 pp. ISBN 978-1-4620-3132-0.

== Reception ==
The book's first edition has been favorably reviewed by Tim Heald in The Times (London), Patricia Beer (London Review of Books), and Firdaus Kanga in the Times Literary Supplement (London). Rajagopal Sloss was interviewed about the book upon publication by Helen Tworkov, for Tricycle: The Buddhist Review magazine; the article incorporates a generally sympathetic review of the work.

The revelations regarding the extramarital affair were met with surprise and consternation by Krishnamurti adherents, and generated a measure of adverse publicity. A Krishnamurti biographer wrote that "history will not view Krishnamurti in quite the same light", yet the same author considered the long-term impact of the revelations doubtful.

Several statements about Krishnamurti published in the work have been characterized as controversial, and provoked rebuttal publications by Krishnamurti associates and affiliated institutions. An independent source has described the book as "deliberately iconoclastic".

== Cultural reference ==
The relationship between Rosalind Rajagopal and Krishnamurti in the 1920s and 1930s is a central plot device in the 2004 musical theatre Blue Dove which was loosely based on Krishnamurti's early life. Peter Wells, an Englishman who wrote the libretto and plot, credits several discussions with Rajagopal Sloss and her mother (on topics covered by the book) as a major factor in the origins of his work; he employs considerable artistic license in portrayals of persons and events. The show, with a running time of two hours and fifteen minutes, premiered in October 2004 at Los Angeles' Ivar Theatre and had a three-week stage run; a 40-minute cast recording was released in 2005.

== See also ==
- List of works about Jiddu Krishnamurti
- Rosalind Rajagopal
