= Choiceless awareness =

Concept in philosophy, psychology and spirituality

Choiceless awareness is posited in philosophy, psychology, and spirituality to be the state of unpremeditated, complete awareness of the present without preference, effort, or compulsion. The term was popularized in mid-20th century by Indian philosopher Jiddu Krishnamurti; the concept is a central theme in his philosophy. Similar or related concepts had been previously developed in several religious or spiritual traditions. The term, or others like it, has also been used to describe traditional and contemporary meditation practices, both secular and religious. By the early 21st century, choiceless awareness as a concept or term had appeared in a variety of fields, including neuroscience, therapy, and sociology, as well as in art. However, Krishnamurti's approach to the subject was unique, and differs from both prior and later notions.

== Jiddu Krishnamurti ==
Choiceless awareness is a major topic in the exposition of Indian philosopher Jiddu Krishnamurti (1895–1986). Beginning in the 1930s, he often commented on the subject, which became a recurring theme in his work. He is considered to have been mainly responsible for the subsequent interest in both the term and the concept.

Krishnamurti held that outside of strictly practical, technical matters, the presence and action of choice indicates confusion and subtle bias: an individual who perceives a given situation in an unbiased manner, without distortion, and therefore with complete awareness, will immediately, naturally, act according to this awareness – the action will be the manifestation and result of this awareness, rather than the result of choice. Such action (and quality of mind) is inherently without conflict.

He did not offer any method to achieve such awareness; in his view, application of technique cannot possibly evolve into, or result in, true choicelessness – just as unceasing application of effort leads to illusory effortlessness, in reality the action of habit. Additionally, in his opinion all methods introduce potential or actual conflict, generated by the practitioner's efforts to comply. According to this analysis, all practices towards achieving choiceless awareness have the opposite effect: they inhibit its action in the present by treating it as a future, premeditated result, and moreover one that is conditioned by the practitioner's implied or expressed expectations.

Krishnamurti stated that for true choicelessness to be realized explicit or implicit choice has to simply, irrevocably, stop; however, not as a result of decision-making, but through the ceasing of the functioning of the chooser or self as a psychological entity. He proposed that such a state might be approached through inquiry based on total attentiveness: identity is then dissolved in complete, all-encompassing attention. Therefore, he considered choiceless awareness a natural attribute of non-self-centered perception, which he called "observation without the observer".

Accordingly, Krishnamurti advised against following any doctrine, discipline, teacher, guru, or authority, including himself. He also advised against following one's own psychological knowledge and experience, which he considered integral parts of the observer. He denied the usefulness of all meditation techniques and methods, but not of meditation itself, which he called "perhaps the greatest" art in life; and stated that insight into choiceless awareness could be shared through open dialogue.

Krishnamurti's ideas on choiceless awareness were discussed by among others, influential Hindu spiritual teacher Ramana Maharshi (1879–1950) and, following wide publication of his books, they attracted the attention of psychologists and psychoanalysts in the 1950s; in subsequent decades Krishnamurti held a number of discussions on this and related subjects with practicing psychotherapists and with researchers in the field. His views on the subject have been included in scholarly papers on existential therapy, education theory, and peace research, but they have also been discussed in less formal or structured settings.

In late 1980, almost half a century after he started discussing it, Krishnamurti included the concept in "The Core of Krishnamurti's Teaching", a pivotal statement of his philosophy: "Freedom is found in the choiceless awareness of our daily existence and activity."

== Other representations ==
In contrast with Krishnamurti's approach, other articulations commonly include choiceless awareness (or related ideas and terms) as part, or as the hoped-for result, of specific methodologies and meditation techniques. Similar concepts and terms appeared or developed in various traditional and contemporary religious or spiritual doctrines and texts, and also within secular disciplines such as psychotherapy, rehabilitation medicine, and counseling. Choiceless awareness has been examined within the context of philosophy of perception and behavior, while studies have cited its possible role in job performance. Other studies have linked meditation based on the concept (among others), with neural activity consistent with increased attentiveness, considered a factor of well-being and happiness.

One term that is often used as a near-synonym is mindfulness, which as a concept has similarities to or may include choiceless awareness. Initially part of Buddhist meditation practice, it has been adapted and utilized for contemporary psychological treatment, and has been applied as a component of integrative medicine programs.

Related themes can be found in the doctrine and meditation practices (such as Vipassanā) associated with the Theravada school of Buddhism; and also in 20th-century offshoots such as the Thai Forest Tradition and the Vipassana movement. Within these and similar fields, for example the Shikantaza practice in Zen Buddhism, choiceless (or effortless) awareness is considered to frequently be the result of a mature progression of practice.

The concept has been included in the discourse of transpersonal philosopher Ken Wilber (b. 1949), and also of independent Indian spiritual teacher Osho (Rajneesh) (1931–1990). Tibetan Buddhism teacher Chögyam Trungpa (1939–1987), who engaged in dialogue with Krishnamurti, used the term to describe the experience of shunyata (Śūnyatā) – in Sanskrit, "emptiness", or "ego-less perception".

Among other fields, the term has appeared in dispute resolution theory and practice, and has found application in artistic endeavors. In dramatic theory, theater criticism, and acting, it has been used to denote spontaneous creativity and related practices or attempts; it has additionally appeared in music works. Author J. D. Salinger (1919–2010), who was interested in spirituality and alternative religions, was reputedly an adherent of Ramana Maharshi's ideas on choiceless awareness.

Contrary to press reports published in the mid-20th-century, later interest in practices related to, or influenced by, choiceless awareness, has resulted in unambiguously favorable mentions in the popular press. Additionally, mass market general interest titles covering the subject have been published.

== See also ==
- Anapanasati
- Nonviolent Communication
