= Roland Vernon =

English writer

- Born: 1 February 1961 (age 65); Dartford, England
- Occupation: Author
- Website: www.rolandvernon.com

Roland Vernon is an English writer. He has published novels, biographies of musicians, and Star in the East, a biography of the philosopher Jiddu Krishnamurti. His début novel was A Dark Enchantment. His second novel, The Maestro’s Voice, was published in 2010, and a third novel, The Good Wife's Castle, in April 2012

== Biography ==
Roland Vernon was born on 1 February 1961 to an English mother and an Italian father (who has played no part in his life, but is a distinguished writer and businessman). He was fostered until the age of eight, after which he went to live with his mother in Vienna. His subsequent childhood homes were in Zambia and Greece, where his stepfather, Jeremy Peake (a Church of England clergyman), was posted. He went to Eton College, King's College, Cambridge (where he was a choral scholar), and the Royal College of Music. After graduating, with a degree in history of art, Roland Vernon trained as an opera singer and for a short while pursued a career as a professional singer. This was followed by two years as a manager at Nimbus Records. In 1991 he began writing professionally, meanwhile also starting his own marquee company. His first marriage to Irene Noel-Baker came to an end in 1988, and in 1991 he married Helen Damamme, with whom he has three sons. Since 1988 his home has been in Somerset.

== Writing ==
In 1989 Roland Vernon won the Ian St James Award for fiction - for a short story which was published by Collins/Fontana. Thereafter he wrote a series of ten monographs about historic opera singers - commissioned by a corporate organisation and published in five volumes.

In 1992 he was signed by Victor Gollancz Ltd to do the biography of tenor José Carreras, but Carreras reneged on the deal at the last minute, and Vernon concentrated instead on a series of eight children's books on composers, published first by Belitha Press, before several translations and coeditions. He then wrote the biography of philosopher Jiddu Krishnamurti, published by Constable in 2000 as Star in the East - Krishnamurti, the Invention of a Messiah.

In 2003 he began work on a novel, later to be entitled A Dark Enchantment, set in the world of brigands and British landowners in nineteenth century Greece. This was published in 2008 by Transworld Books, was the winner of The Daily Mail First Novel Award, and shortlisted for other prizes. Two further fiction titles were commissioned as a result. The first, The Maestro's Voice, about the life of an operatic superstar in 1920s Naples, was published in 2010. The next, The Good Wife's Castle, a psychological thriller, came out in April 2012. 2019 saw his publication of the non-fiction work, Children of the Corn Maiden, a history of the Vernon family.
