= Commentaries on Living =

Series of books by Jiddu Krishnamurti

- First volume, first edition
- Author: Jiddu Krishnamurti
- Cover artist: Ellen Raskin
- Country: United States
- Language: English
- Genre: Creative nonfiction (philosophy)
- Publisher: Harper
- Published: 1956–1960
- Media type: Print
- No. of books: 3 (List of books)

Commentaries on Living: From the notebooks of J. Krishnamurti is a series of books by Jiddu Krishnamurti. It consists of 3 volumes, originally published in 1956, 1958 and 1960.

== About the series ==
During the 1930s and 1940s Krishnamurti was intermittently keeping notes of his philosophical observations, his inner states, his musings about nature, and his discussions with individuals and groups. Aldous Huxley, a longtime friend of his (they first met in 1938), encouraged him to continue writing, and to eventually publish the notes. The resulting series of books, subtitled "From the notebooks of J. Krishnamurti", was edited by Krishnamurti associate Rajagopal Desikacharya (commonly D. Rajagopal).

== List ==
- Jiddu, Krishnamurti (1956). Desikacharya, Rajagopal (ed.). Commentaries on Living. From the notebooks of J. Krishnamurti. Vol. Series One (1st US ed.). New York: Harper. 254 pp. OCLC 1207760.
- —— (1958). Desikacharya, Rajagopal (ed.). Commentaries on Living. From the notebooks of J. Krishnamurti. Vol. Series Two (1st US ed.). New York: Harper. 242 pp. OCLC 317495017.
- —— (1960). Desikacharya, Rajagopal (ed.). Commentaries on Living. From the notebooks of J. Krishnamurti. Vol. Series Three (1st US ed.). New York: Harper. 312 pp. OCLC 1579146.

== Select editions ==
=== Quest Books ===
- Jiddu, Krishnamurti (1967). Desikacharya, Rajagopal (ed.). Commentaries on Living. From the notebooks of J. Krishnamurti. Vol. First Series (1st Quest Books ed.). Wheaton, Illinois: Theosophical Publishing House. 288 pp. ISBN 0-8356-0390-3.
- —— (1967). Desikacharya, Rajagopal (ed.). Commentaries on Living. From the notebooks of J. Krishnamurti. Vol. Second Series (1st Quest Books ed.). Wheaton, Illinois: Theosophical Publishing House. 242 pp. ISBN 0-8356-0415-2.
- —— (1967). Desikacharya, Rajagopal (ed.). Commentaries on Living. From the notebooks of J. Krishnamurti. Vol. Third Series (1st Quest Books ed.). Wheaton, Illinois: Theosophical Publishing House. 312 pp. ISBN 0-8356-0402-0.

=== Indian subcontinent ===
- Jiddu, Krishnamurti (2006). Desikacharya, Rajagopal (ed.). Commentaries on Living. From the notebooks of J. Krishnamurti. Vol. First Series (Indian subcontinent ed.). New Delhi: Penguin Books. ISBN 978-0-14-400151-4.
- —— (2006). Desikacharya, Rajagopal (ed.). Commentaries on Living. From the notebooks of J. Krishnamurti. Vol. Second Series (Indian subcontinent ed.). New Delhi: Penguin Books. ISBN 978-0-14-400152-1.
- —— (2006). Desikacharya, Rajagopal (ed.). Commentaries on Living. From the notebooks of J. Krishnamurti. Vol. Third Series (Indian subcontinent ed.). New Delhi: Penguin Books. ISBN 978-0-14-400153-8.

== Other media ==
The First Series was released as an audiobook on audio cassette. The whole series is available as an ebook in several editions and formats.

== Reviews ==
- C. P. Surendran (11 March 2007). "An Impossible Guru". The Times of India. New Delhi. OCLC 23379369. – Review of the 2006 Indian subcontinent edition.
- P. Rama Moorthy (1980). "J. Krishnamurti's Commentaries on Living: The Classic as a Vision of Clarity". The Literary Criterion. 15 (2). Mysore: Dhvanyaloka: 1–11. ISSN 0024-452X.
- Wilson Ross, Nancy (25 March 1961). "Expressing the inexpressible". Saturday Review. 44 (12). New York: Saturday Review Associates: 18–19. ISSN 0036-4983. – Comprehensive review of Series Three & (1st US edition).

== See also ==
- Jiddu Krishnamurti bibliography
