= Rosalind Rajagopal =

American educator (1903–1996)

Rosalind Edith Rajagopal (née Williams; June 20, 1903 – January 24, 1996) was a long-time director of the Happy Valley School (Besant Hill School) in Ojai, California. She co-founded the school in 1946 with Indian philosopher Jiddu Krishnamurti, Italian literary critic Guido Ferrando, and English author Aldous Huxley.

Through her family's involvement in the Theosophical Society she became acquainted with Jiddu Krishnamurti and his ailing younger brother Nitya in 1922. Rosalind developed close ties with the brothers, and sometime after her 1927 marriage to their fellow Indian associate D. Rajagopal, she and Krishnamurti began a long-term romantic relationship. This became a source of controversy when it was publicly revealed in the 1991 book Lives in the Shadow with J. Krishnamurti, written by her daughter, Radha Rajagopal Sloss.

== Early life ==
She was born June 20, 1903 in Buffalo, New York to John Williams and Sophia Waldow. Christened Rosalind Edith, she was the youngest of four daughters, noted for her beauty and vivacity. In 1918, Sophia Williams left her husband and moved to Hollywood with her daughters. It was through Rosalind's Theosophist sister Erma, that she met fellow Theosophist Mary Gray.

In 1922, Gray enlisted Rosalind to help with the newly arrived from India Jiddu brothers, who were staying at Gray's estate in Ojai, California. Jiddu Krishnamurti (1895–1986), then twenty-seven years old, was being groomed by the quasi-mystical, pan-religious society as the "vehicle" of the World Teacher – a messianic, Christ-like spiritual leader and teacher, imminently expected by many Theosophists. His brother Jiddu Nityananda ("Nitya", 1898–1925), was charged with fulfilling administrative and organizational duties related to Krishnamurti's presumed mission. Rosalind was asked to be a companion and nurse to Nitya, who was suffering from tuberculosis, and became close to both. This relationship led to her being one of the witnesses to the reputed strange experiences that affected Krishnamurti in Ojai during August–September 1922.

Because of her special relationship with the Jiddus, Rosalind moved with them through influential Theosophical circles, making the acquaintance of Annie Besant, Charles Webster Leadbeater and authors Emily and Mary Lutyens. She accompanied the brothers to India and Australia in 1925. In Sydney Nitya's tuberculosis grew worse, hastening the trio's return to the more beneficial climate of Ojai in July of that year. According to Rajagopal Sloss, Rosalind and Nitya were in love when he died in November 1925, leaving Rosalind permanently affected.

== Marriage and friendships ==
In 1927, Rosalind married Rajagopalacharya Desikacharya (commonly D. Rajagopal, 1900–1993), while in London, in a wedding organized with great care and enthusiasm by Besant, who was approving of the couple's relationship.

D. Rajagopal, Krishnamurti's friend and editor, and Rosalind, had been charged by Besant with looking after Krishnamurti's interests following the death of Nitya. The three lived in close proximity in Ojai from the late 1920s through the 1960s, and the Rajagopals were closely involved with Krishnamurti when he broke with the Theosophical Society and began his independent speaking career in 1929.

Rosalind's marriage was not a happy one; after the birth of her daughter Radha in 1931, the couple became physically estranged, and their relationship was never close again. The Rajagopals finally divorced in the early 1960s. According to Rajagopal Sloss, the long affair between Krishnamurti and Rosalind began in 1932 and endured for about twenty-five years. However, the ending of the relationship was not amicable, and damaged their friendship, which never recovered.

During the late 1930s Krishnamurti and Rosalind became close friends with Aldous and Maria Huxley, who then lived nearby. The English author reputedly modeled the character of Virginia in his 1939 novel After Many a Summer, on Rosalind. She was present at Huxley's deathbed on 22 November 1963.

== Happy Valley School and Foundation ==
Rosalind became the director of the Happy Valley School (later renamed Besant Hill School) after its inception in 1946, and eventually became president of the Happy Valley Foundation. Krishnamurti disassociated from the school in the early 1960s as the relationships of Rosalind, D. Rajagopal, and himself became increasingly acrimonious.

Their subsequent complete break led to legal actions pitting D. Rajagopal; an older Krishnamurti organization (Krishnamurti Writings Inc. or KWINC, of which D. Rajagopal was the head); and its trustees, vs. J. Krishnamurti; the newer Krishnamurti foundations; and their trustees. As Rosalind was involved in the disputes, her already-distant and unamiable relationship with Krishnamurti dissolved completely in the face of the legal and personality conflicts. Most of the legal matters were resolved after Krishnamurti's death in 1986; however, the three never made up their personal differences.

Rosalind served on the Happy Valley Foundation board of directors until 1988. She shared a house for many years with artist Beatrice Wood in Ojai, where she died on January 24, 1996, aged 92.
