= Eerde, Ommen =

Eerde
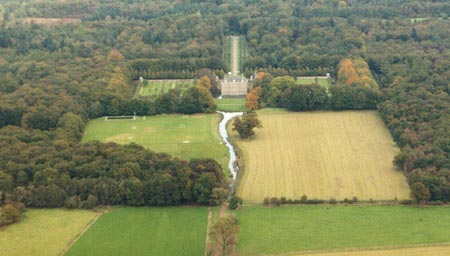
- Eerde Castle

- Eerde in the municipality of Ommen.

- Location in the province of Overijssel in the Netherlands Eerde (Netherlands)
- Coordinates: 52°29′7″N 6°27′10″E
- Country: Netherlands
- Province: Overijssel
- Municipality: Ommen

Area
  - Total: 8.62 km^{2} (3.33 sq mi)
- Elevation: 7 m (23 ft)

Population (2021)
  - Total: 80
  - Density: 9.3/km^{2} (24/sq mi)
- Time zone: UTC+1 (CET)
  - Summer (DST): UTC+2 (CEST)
- Postal code: 7731
- Dialing code: 0523

Eerde is a hamlet in the province of Overijssel in the Netherlands. It is part of the municipality of Ommen, and lies about 21 km (13 mi) northwest of Almelo.

At the heart of the Eerde hamlet lies Eerde castle, a castle in the Dutch-classical style from 1715, surrounded by a 1,667 hectares (4,120 acres) estate in the Baroque style managed by the Natuurmonumenten foundation since 1965.

The first castle on this site was built in the 14th century, but was soon destroyed by the forces of the Archbishop of Utrecht in 1380. The Van Twickelo, Van Renesse, and Van Pallandt families have lived in castles on this site since.

In the early 1920s, baron Philip van Pallandt deeded the castle and surrounding land to the Order of the Star in the East, an organization connected to the famous philosopher and spiritual teacher Jiddu Krishnamurti, of whom the baron was an avid follower. The Order held annual gatherings of its members in the castle grounds until its dissolution in 1929; the deed to the estate was officially transferred back to the van Pallandt family in 1931, however Krishnamurti continued to occasionally use the estate for lectures and meetings until the outbreak of World War II. During the war the estate had been used as a concentration camp (Camp Erika) by the occupying German forces, and afterwards Krishnamurti felt this precluded its use as a proper meeting space.

In 1934, the castle was turned into a school for German Jewish children threatened by the Nazi regime. This school, founded by the Quakers, had to be closed under pressure from the German occupiers in 1943. Fourteen students did not escape the invaders and were arrested and murdered. This boarding school was known as Quaker School Eerde.

After World War II the school continued in the country house and its outbuildings as a secondary school for Dutch and foreign students. In 1959 the Quaker institution was relocated to Kasteel Beverweerd in the Province of Utrecht. A new, non-denominational boarding school, now known as International School Eerde, occupied the buildings. English is the principal language of instruction. and it now offers IGCSEs and IB programmes to its students.
