= Dhruva Natchathiram (soundtrack) =

Soundtrack album by Harris Jayaraj
- Released: 28 October 2023
- Recorded: 2018–2023
- Studios: Studio H, Chennai
- Genre: Feature film soundtrack
- Length: 18:36
- Languages: Tamil, Spanish, English
- Label: Sony Music India
- Producer: Harris Jayaraj

Harris Jayaraj chronology
The Legend (2022)	Dhruva Natchathiram (2023)	Extra Ordinary Man (2023)

Singles from Dhruva Natchathiram
- 1. "Oru Manam" Released: 7 October 2020; 2. "His Name is John" Released: 21 July 2023; 3. "Naracha Mudi" Released: 28 October 2023

Dhruva Natchathiram is the soundtrack to the upcoming Indian Tamil-language spy action film of the same name written, directed and produced by Gautham Vasudev Menon, starring Vikram. The film features musical score composed by Harris Jayaraj, with lyrics written by Thamarai, Paal Dabba, Monica Perez Castillo and Aira. The soundtrack featured five songs with three of them—"Oru Manam", "His Name Is John" and "Naracha Mudi"—released as singles. The album was released by Sony Music India on 28 October 2023.

== Background ==
A. R. Rahman was announced as the film's composer in April 2013, when Menon initially announced the film with Suriya in the lead. However, the project was dropped due to creative differences between Menon and Suriya. When the project was revived with Vikram in the lead in January 2017, Harris Jayaraj who was known for Menon's successive collaborations since the latter's debut film, Minnale (2001) signed the film as a composer. The untitled song in the first teaser was written and sung by Aaryan Dinesh Kanagaratnam and Sri Rascol. This was not included in the film's music album.

The production of the film's music took six years, as the film was consequently delayed to financial constraints. Initially, the film was supposed to have only one song entitled "Oru Manam" that had been composed very earlier for the film. But after watching the film, Harris demanded that there are certain moments in the film that needed music. Hence, four more songs were composed for the film after being shot. Harris started working on the film's background score by late-February 2023.

== Release ==
"Oru Manam" is the first song to be released from the film. Being announced in June 2018, the song was supposed to be released by late-November 2018, but could not do so citing the production delays. A live performance of the song by Karthik and Shashaa Tirupati at a musical concert in Singapore in February 2020 indicated its possible release. In September 2020, Menon announced the song is set to be released the following month. The song was released as a digital single on 7 October 2020, that accompanied with a music video, that showcases Vikram's relationship with Ritu Varma and Aishwarya Rajesh, that was simultaneously edited with the film's action sequences. However, the video was removed from YouTube in late-July 2023, and the song was later re-released as a lyric video that month. The deletion was primarily resulted due to Aishwarya Rajesh's portions that were edited from the film.

Initially, the audio was supposed to be launched at Harris' musical concert in Malaysia on 17 June 2023, which did not happen. The second song "His Name Is John" was released on 21 July 2023, sung by independent artist Paal Dabba. Paal Dabba earlier collaborated with Harris for a song in Jayam Ravi's Brother. Menon who liked a snippet of his song, had insisted him to record this track for the film. The third single "Naracha Mudi" sung by Srilekha Parthasarathy was released on 28 October 2023, along with the full album, that included two other songs: "Arugil" and "Part of Me".

== Track listing ==
Track listing
No.	Title	Lyrics	Singer(s)	Length
1.	"Oru Manam"	Thamarai	Karthik, Shashaa Tirupati, Vikram	5:42
2.	"His Name Is John"	Paal Dabba	Paal Dabba	3:50
3.	"Naracha Mudi"	Thamarai	Srilekha Parthasarathy	3:00
4.	"Arugil"	Thamarai, Monica Perez Castillo (Spanish)	Hariharan, Tanvi Shah	3:59
5.	"Part Of Me"	Aira (English)	Girish Pradhan	2:07
Total length:				18:36

== Reception ==
The Times of India described the song "Oru Manam" as "melodious". Critic based at The Hindu described "His Name Is John" as "a peppy gaana song" that "tells of the badass that is John (Vikram’s character)" and The Indian Express also said "The song is unique as its blends Tamil rap with both Tamil folk music and modern sounds". A critic from The Statesman reviewing for "Naracha Mudi" said that "the track is layered with both playful but heartfelt romance alongside a level of lust" while praising Srilekha's vocals as "delight to listen to" and Harris' music complementing the vocals well. S. Devasankar reviewing for Pinkvilla, called it as a "soulful proclamation of love" while also saying "The song also has the classic vibe of a folk song, which music director Harris Jayaraj has managed to elevate using percussions that stand out."
