= Dhruva (band) =

Indian music band

Dhruva, originally spelled as Dhruvaa (Devnagari ध्रुवा), is an Indian musical band. It is considered to be India's first Sanskrit band.

The band is based in Bhopal, Madhya Pradesh. The band's genre is a fusion with the use of Indian instruments such as bansuri, shankha, tabla, pakhavaj and European instruments such as harmonium, guitar and acoustic drums. The band was founded by Dr. Sanjay Dwivedi, who has a doctoral degree in Sanskrit and is a practitioner of Indian classical music. The band first played on 24 January 2015, with other members being Vaibhav Santore and Gyneshwari Parsai In 2015 the band played at World Sanskrit Day celebrations in New Delhi. Apart from original compositions their numbers are taken from Rig Veda, the works of Adi Shankaracharya, Shiv Tandav, Jaidev, Madhurashtakam, love letters from Abhigyan Shakuntala.
