= Order of the Star in the East =

Spiritual organization based in India (1911–1927)

- Abbreviation: OSE
- Predecessor: Order of the Rising Sun
- Successor: Order of the Star
- Established: April 1911; 115 years ago
- Founder: Annie Besant
- Dissolved: June 1927; 99 years ago
- Type: Spiritual organization
- Purpose: Inform and prepare the world for the appearance of the World Teacher
- Headquarters: Benares (Varanasi), India
- Region served: Worldwide
- Members: Over 43,000 (est.) (1926)
- Secretary General: A. E. Wodehouse (1911–20); Jiddu Nityananda (1920–25); D. Rajagopal (1925–27)
- Head: Jiddu Krishnamurti
- Co-Protector: Annie Besant
- Co-Protector: C. W. Leadbeater
- Main organ: The Herald of the Star
- Parent organization: Theosophical Society
- Subsidiaries: Star Publishing Trust
- Affiliations: National Sections in over 40 countries and territories; Servants of the Star (youth organization)

The Order of the Star in the East (OSE) was an international organization based at Benares (Varanasi), India, from 1911 to 1927. It was established by the leadership of the Theosophical Society at Adyar, Madras (Chennai) to prepare the world for the arrival of a reputed messianic entity, the World Teacher or Maitreya. The OSE acquired members worldwide as it expanded in many countries; a third of its diverse membership c. 1926 was unaffiliated with the Theosophical Society. The precursor of the OSE was the Order of the Rising Sun (1910–11, also at Benares) and the successor was the Order of the Star (1927–29, based at Ommen, the Netherlands). The precursor organization was formed after leading Theosophists discovered a likely candidate for the new Messiah in the then–adolescent Jiddu Krishnamurti (1895–1986), a South Indian Brahmin who was installed as Head of the Order. Almost two decades later Krishnamurti rejected the messianic role, repudiated the Order's mission and in 1929 disbanded the OSE's successor. The founding and activities of these organizations as well as the largely unexpected dissolution of the OSE's successor, attracted widespread media attention and public interest. They also led to crises in the Theosophical Society and to schisms in Theosophy. Krishnamurti's later multi-decade career as a notable independent philosopher has been a factor in evaluations of the OSE and its mission.

== Background ==
One of the central tenets of late 19th-century Theosophy as promoted by the Theosophical Society was the complex doctrine of intelligent evolution of all existence. This was said to be occurring on a Cosmic scale, across the physical and non-physical aspects of the known and unknown Universe, and affecting all of its constituent parts regardless of apparent size or importance. The theory was originally described in The Secret Doctrine (published 1888), a book by Helena Blavatsky, a Russian occultist who was one of the founders of contemporary Theosophy and the Theosophical Society.

According to this view Humankind's evolution on Earth (and beyond) is part of the Cosmic evolution. It is reputedly overseen by a hidden hierarchy, the Masters of the Ancient Wisdom, whose upper ranks consist of advanced spiritual beings. Blavatsky stated she was in contact with members of the reputed hierarchy; she described the Theosophical Society as one of the hierarchy's many attempts (or "impulses") through the millennia, to guide Humanity – in line with the intelligent evolutionary scheme – to its ultimate, immutable objective: The attainment of perfection and the conscious participation in the evolutionary process. These attempts may require an Earth-based infrastructure (such as the Theosophical Society) to pave the way for the hierarchy's physically appearing emissaries, "the torch-bearer[s] of Truth". The mission of these reputedly regularly appearing emissaries is to practically translate, in a way and language understood by contemporary humanity, knowledge that would help it reach a higher evolutionary stage.

== History ==
=== Early history ===
Blavatsky wrote about the possible impact of Theosophy and the Theosophical Society in her book The Key to Theosophy (published 1889):

If the present attempt, in the form of our Society, succeeds better than its predecessors have done, then it will be in existence as an organized, living and healthy body when the time comes for the effort of the XXth century. The general condition of men's minds and hearts will have been improved and purified by the spread of its teachings, and, ... their prejudices and dogmatic illusions will have been, to some extent at least, removed. Not only so, but besides a large and accessible literature ready to men's hands, the next impulse will find a numerous and united body of people ready to welcome the new torch-bearer of Truth. He will find the minds of men prepared for his message, a language ready for him in which to clothe the new truths he brings, an organization awaiting his arrival, which will remove the merely mechanical, material obstacles and difficulties from his path. Think how much one, to whom such an opportunity is given, could accomplish. [Emphasis in original.]

— Helena Blavatsky, The Key to Theosophy

Based on this and other Blavatsky writings, Theosophists expected the future arrival of the "next impulse"; additional information was the purview of the Society's Esoteric Section, which Blavatsky had founded and originally led.

After Blavatsky's death in 1891, influential British Theosophist Charles Webster Leadbeater expanded on her writings about the Masters and their hierarchy. He formulated a Christology that identified Christ with the Theosophical representation of the Buddhist concept of Maitreya, and stated the entity occupied one of the highest positions in the hierarchy. Leadbeater believed that Maitreya-as-Christ had manifested on Earth on several occasions, often using a specially prepared individual as a "vehicle". The incarnated Maitreya assumed the role of World Teacher, dispensing knowledge about underlying truths of Existence.

Annie Besant, another well-known and influential British Theosophist (and eventual close associate of Leadbeater's), was also interested in the appearance of the next emissary from the spiritual hierarchy. During the 1890s and 1900s she became progressively convinced, along with Leadbeater and others, that this would happen sooner than in Blavatsky's stated timeline. They came to believe it would involve the imminent reappearance of Maitreya as World Teacher, a monumental event in the Theosophical worldview. However, not all Theosophical Society members accepted Leadbeater's and Besant's ideas on the matter; the dissidents accused them of deviating from Theosophical orthodoxy and along with other concepts developed by the two, their elaborations on the Theosophical Maitreya were derisively labelled Neo-Theosophy by their opponents.

Besant became President of the Theosophical Society in 1907, adding considerable weight to the belief of Maitreya's impending manifestation; this became a commonly held expectation among Theosophists. She had been commenting on the arrival of the next emissary as early as 1896; by 1909 the proclaimed "coming Teacher" was a main topic of her lectures and writings.

=== "Discovery" of Jiddu Krishnamurti ===
Sometime in the first half of 1909 (likely between late April and late May) Leadbeater encountered Jiddu Krishnamurti, a fourteen-year-old South Indian Brahmin, at the private beach of the Theosophical Society Headquarters in Adyar, Madras (Chennai). At the time Jiddu Narayaniah, Krishnamurti's father and longtime Theosophist, was employed by the Society; the family, in poor condition, lived next to the compound. Leadbeater was a controversial figure whose knowledge of Occult matters was highly respected by the Society's leadership, and was considered clairvoyant by Theosophists. He was by then looking for suitable prospects for the "vehicle" of the World Teacher, and was struck by Krishnamurti's "remarkable aura" upon meeting him. Leadbeater came to believe the boy – who was not the first or only candidate – was the most promising, notwithstanding Krishnamurti's reputedly poor appearance, dull personality, and lackluster intellect. Despite Narayaniah's reservations, Leadbeater soon placed Krishnamurti and at the latter's insistence his inseparable younger brother Jiddu Nityananda ("Nitya"), under his and the Society's care. In late 1909 Besant, as President of the Society and head of its Esoteric Section, admitted the Jiddu brothers into both. In March 1910 she became their legal guardian; the boys had already been separated from their family and moved into the Theosophical compound.

Following the "discovery" Leadbeater began occult examinations of Krishnamurti, to whom he had assigned the pseudonym Alcyone – the name of a star in the Pleiades star cluster and of characters from Greek mythology. Leadbeater's belief in the boy's suitability was strengthened by his clairvoyance-aided investigations of Krishnamurti's reputed past and future lives. Records of these investigations were published in Theosophical magazines starting April 1910, and in a book in 1913. They were widely discussed within the Society as according to Leadbeater, contemporary Theosophists were involved in various "lives of Alcyone". Such reputed involvement became a matter of status and prestige among Theosophists; it also contributed to factionalism within the Society. In the meantime, Krishnamurti readily submitted to a comprehensive multi-year regimen of physical, intellectual, social and spiritual training in preparation for his probable future role.

=== Order of the Rising Sun ===
Included in Krishnamurti's spiritual training was reputedly instruction delivered directly by the Masters, who had accepted him as pupil. In late 1910 part of this instruction was published by the Theosophical Society as the first work "by Alcyone", in a booklet entitled At the Feet of the Master.‍ The book became very popular among Theosophists and around the same time (officially, in January 1911), the Order of the Rising Sun was founded at Benares (Varanasi) by George Arundale, a prominent Theosophist. Arundale, Principal of the Central Hindu College (CHC), was impressed by Alcyone and his writings, and formed the Order around a CHC-based study group of disciples headed by Krishnamurti. The new entity was generally focused on the expected World Teacher, yet the recently discovered Krishnamurti-Alcyone was – somewhat obliquely – at the center of its attention. Ernest Armine (E.A.) Wodehouse, Professor of English at the CHC, was a member and commented, "[w]e were no blind devotees, prepared to see in him [Krishnamurti] nothing but perfection.... Had there been a trace in him of conceit or affection, or any posing as the 'holy child' or of priggish self-consciousness, we would undoubtebly have given an adverse verdict."

The activities and proclamations of Leadbeater, Besant and other senior Theosophists regarding Krishnamurti and the expected Teacher became entangled in prior disputes within and without the Theosophical Society, and the subject of new controversies. The evolving controversies as well as objections by Hindu members of the CHC faculty, prompted Besant to disband the organization in May 1911; however a replacement had already been formed.

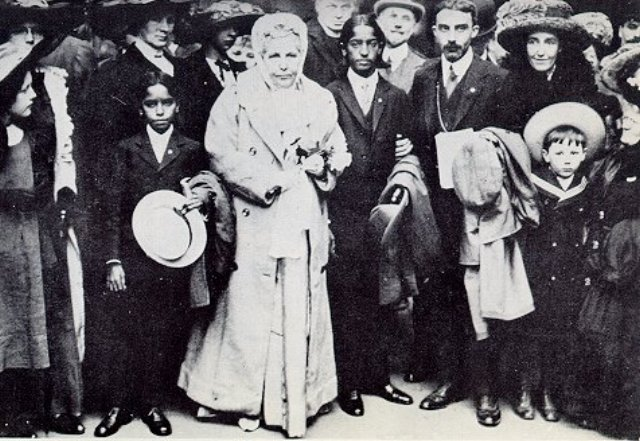
Annie Besant and Jiddu Krishnamurti (center), flanked by Jiddu Nityananda (left) and George Arundale (right). London, May 1911.

=== Order of the Star in the East ===
In April 1911 Besant founded the Order of the Star in the East (OSE) based again at Benares, which replaced the Order of the Rising Sun. It was named after the Star of Bethlehem, signifying the proclaimed approach of the new manifestation of Christ-Maitreya. The top positions of the organization were filled: "Mrs Besant and Leadbeater were made Protectors of the new Order of which Krishna [Jiddu Krishnamurti] was the Head, Arundale Private Secretary to the Head, and Wodehouse Organising Secretary". News about Krishnamurti, the Order and its mission received widespread publicity and worldwide press coverage; the publicity may have been at least partly driven by aspects of the era's prevailing fin de siècle mood.

==== Objective and Principles ====
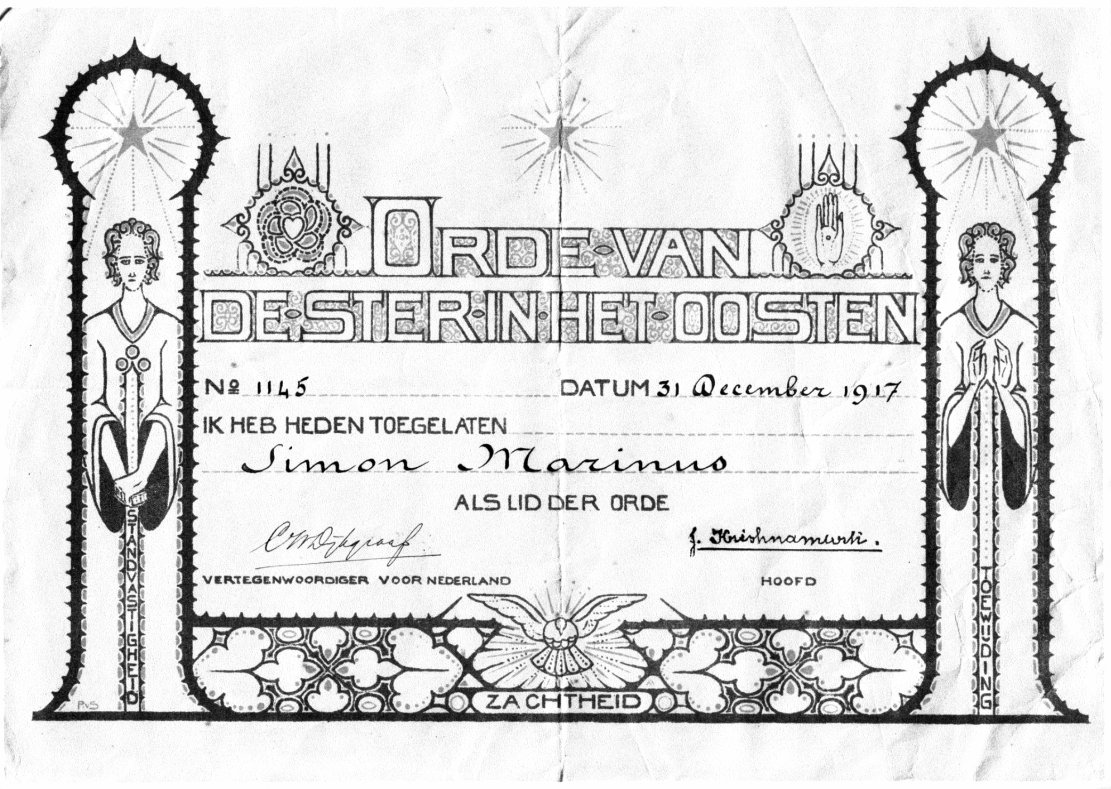
Order of the Star in the East membership certificate (Netherlands Section, 1917). Black and white copy, reduced.

The goal of the OSE was to inform the world about the arrival of the World Teacher, correct misconceptions regarding his mission, and remove physical obstacles and difficulties from his path. By late 1913 the Order had about 15,000 members worldwide; most of them were also members of the Theosophical Society. The only precondition for membership was acceptance of the "Declaration of Principles", which stated the following:

1. We believe that a great Teacher will soon appear in the world, and we wish so to live now that we may be worthy to know Him when He comes.
2. We shall try, therefore, to keep Him in our minds always, and to do in His name, and therefore to the best of our ability, all the work which comes to us in our daily occupations.
3. As far as our ordinary duties allow, we shall endeavour to devote a portion of our time each day to some definite work which may help to prepare for His coming.
4. We shall seek to make Devotion, Steadfastness and Gentleness prominent characteristics of our daily life.
5. We shall try to begin and end each day with a short period devoted to the asking of His blessing upon all that we try to do for Him and in His name.
6. We regard it as our special duty to try to recognise and reverence greatness in whomsoever shown, and to strive to co-operate, as far as we can, with those whom we feel to be spiritually our superiors.

— Order of the Star in the East, "Declaration of Principles"

The organization had no other rules and there were no fees or subscriptions. New members received an OSE certificate and could thereafter display the organization's emblem, a silver five-pointed star.‍

==== Activities ====
Official Bulletins

The Herald of the Star
- 1912–13, Adyar, Chennai; 1914–27, London
- Jiddu Krishnamurti, editor
- OCLC 225662044

The Star Review
- 1928–29, London
- Emily Lutyens, editor
- OCLC 224323863

International Star Bulletin
- November 1927 – July 1929, Ommen
- D. Rajagopal & R. L. Christie, editors
- OCLC 34693176
- Notes: Several National Sections of the Order also published their own Star bulletins; The International Star Bulletin continued in a new series

External image
- Front cover of The Herald of the Star, December 1916 (vol. 5, no. 12) ‍

Following its establishment the OSE began its mission in earnest. Lecture tours, meetings and other activities were undertaken by prominent members of the Order. Articles and pamphlets about the OSE and its mission, published regularly by Theosophical organizations, were joined by an official bulletin, The Herald of the Star, initially based at Adyar, which started publication in January 1912.

As Krishnamurti came of age, he embarked on an intensified schedule of lectures and discussions in several countries and acquired a large following among the membership of the Theosophical Society. National Sections of the Order were eventually formed in more than forty countries and territories. An affiliated international youth organization, the Servants of the Star, was established in London, England in October 1913 with Krishnamurti's younger brother Nitya as its Head; it accepted persons under 21 years of age as members.

On 28 December 1911, during a ceremony officiated by Krishnamurti at the close of the annual Theosophical Convention (held that year at Benares), those present were said to be suddenly overwhelmed by a strange feeling of "tremendous power", which seemed to be flowing through Krishnamurti. In Leadbeater's description, "it reminded one irresistibly of the rushing, mighty wind, and the outpouring of the Holy Ghost at Pentecost. The tension was enormous, and every one in the room was most powerfully affected." The next day, at a meeting of the Esoteric Section, Besant for the first time stated that it was clear Krishnamurti was the required vehicle. Thereafter, 28 December became a "sacred day" for the Order.

In 1912 Krishnamurti's father sued Besant to revoke her guardianship of his sons, which he had previously granted. Among the reasons stated in Narayaniah's deposition were accusations regarding Leadbeater's character and objections to the alleged deification of Krishnamurti, blamed on Besant's "announcement that he was to be the Lord Christ, with the result that a number of respectable persons had prostrated before him." Besant eventually won the case on appeal.

Also in 1912 most members of the Theosophical Society's well-represented German Section followed its head, Rudolf Steiner, in splitting from the parent entity – partly due to disagreement over Besant's and Leadbeater's proclamations concerning Krishnamurti's messianic status.

Controversy regarding the OSE and Krishnamurti again engulfed the Central Hindu College. In 1913 a number of the Order's supporters resigned their positions at the CHC following opposition by the school's administration and trustees, who considered the Order's activities unacademical.

In 1920 Nitya replaced Wodehouse as OSE Organizing Secretary. The next year, the first international Congress of the Order of the Star in the East was held in Paris, France, attended by 2,000 members out of then about 30,000 worldwide. At the Congress it was decided that there would be no special ceremonies or rituals associated with the Order or the World Teacher. Also in the 1920s, regularly scheduled multi-day Star Camps supported by well-organized facilities started to be held in the Netherlands, the United States and India. They were attended by thousands of members, with coverage provided by local and international media.

In 1922 during a stay in Ojai, California, Krishnamurti had a series of physical, psychological and spiritual experiences over a period of several months, that affected him deeply. Rumors of strange happenings started circulating among OSE members, yet the events of Ojai (and similar later Krishnamurti experiences) remained unknown outside of the Theosophical leadership and Krishnamurti's inner circle.

In late 1925 close Krishnamurti associate and friend D. Rajagopal was appointed General Secretary following Nitya's unexpected death. While the Order's activities continued without visible disruption, Nitya's death was a privately devastating, watershed event for Krishnamurti.

Financing the venture and subsequent expansion did not appear to present a problem. Properties in several countries were acquired via specially-formed trusts or by affiliates of the Order, for a variety of purposes. Donations were regularly solicited, along with project-based funding appeals to the members, some of whom were considerably wealthy. In collaboration with the Theosophical Society the OSE had been producing a number of publications and propaganda material; in 1926 it organized its own publishing arm, the Star Publishing Trust, based at Eerde, Ommen, the Netherlands. Along with an official international bulletin published in Ommen (the International Star Bulletin), national bulletins eventually appeared in twenty-one countries and in fourteen different languages. Also in 1926 it was reported that the Order's membership was over 43,000, two thirds of which were also members of the Theosophical Society.

==== Claims and expectations ====
By year-end 1925 expectations about the "Coming" and related activities of prominent Theosophists and their factions were reaching a climax. Extraordinary pronouncements of accelerated spiritual advancement were being made by various parties, privately disputed by others, and there were insinuations of jockeying for position. Ranking members of the Order and the Society had publicly declared they were chosen as apostles of the new Messiah. The escalating claims of spiritual success and the internal (and hidden from the public) Theosophical politics alienated the increasingly disillusioned Krishnamurti. His commitment and enthusiasm had been uneven since the Order's early days; in private he had occasionally expressed doubts about his presumed mission and discomfort with the adulation of the Order's members. He refused to recognize anyone as his disciple or apostle. In the meantime World Teacher-related spinoff projects proliferated: In August 1925 the establishment of a "World Religion" and a "World University" were announced by the Theosophical leadership. Both of them were later "quietly shelved".

The annual Star Congress for 1925 opened at Adyar on the "sacred day" of 28 December, following the much anticipated but uneventful Theosophical Convention. At the opening an event occurred that was reminiscent of the reputed incident on the same day of 1911. Krishnamurti was giving a speech about the World Teacher and the significance of his coming, when "a dramatic change" took place. His voice suddenly altered and he switched to first person, saying "'... I come for those who want sympathy, who want happiness, who are longing to be released, who are longing to find happiness in all things. I come to reform and not to tear down, I come not to destroy but to build.'" For many in the audience who noticed, it was a "spine-tingling" revelation, "felt ... instantly and independently" – confirmation, in their view, that the manifestation of Lord Maitreya through the chosen vehicle had begun.

=== Order of the Star ===
The reputed manifestation of the World Teacher resulted in celebratory statements and assertions by senior Theosophists that were not unanimously accepted by Society members, and controversy about the so-called "World Teacher Project" persisted. Besant and other leaders of the Society largely managed to contain the dissenters and the controversy, at the cost of unflattering publicity. However the Project was also receiving serious and neutral coverage in the global media, and according to reports it was followed sympathetically and with interest by non-Theosophists.

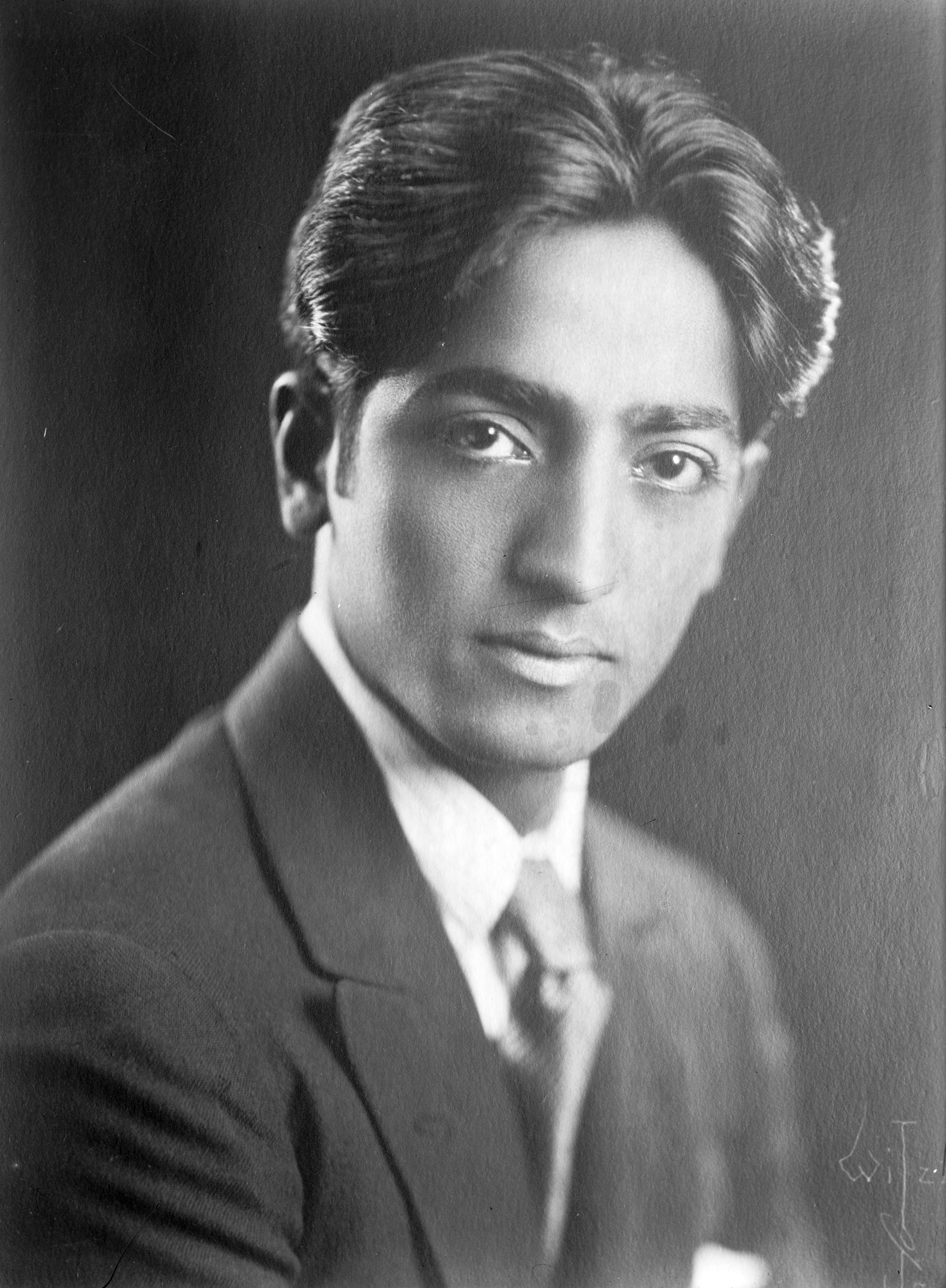
Jiddu Krishnamurti in the 1920s

In related developments following the perceived manifestation, Besant announced in January 1927 "[t]he World Teacher is here", and many Star members expected Krishnamurti's unequivocal public proclamation of his messianic status. Land was purchased in Ojai for a "colony project", to serve as a "miniature model of a new civilisation" mentored by the World Teacher. Reflecting the new situation, in June 1927 the name of the organization was changed to Order of the Star and its main organ was retitled The Star Review; the organization relocated at Ommen, with D. Rajagopal serving as Chief Organizer.

The successor organization had two objectives:

- To draw together all those who believe in the Presence of the World Teacher in the world
- To work with Him for the establishment of His ideas

Complementing the reorganization and the proclamations of the World Teacher's manifestation, in 1928 the "World Mother Project", headed by Rukmini Devi Arundale (George Arundale's young Indian wife), was set in motion by Theosophical leaders. Krishnamurti distanced himself from the new venture, which Indian and international press reports dubbed "Mrs. Besant's New Fad", and it was short-lived.

=== Dissolution and repudiation ===
Krishnamurti's scepticism, increasingly visible by 1926, was accompanied by his occasional affirmations of the World Teacher mission and role, including in early 1927. By the middle of the same year there was a consistent shift in his emphasis: To the consternation of Theosophists and the growing confusion of his followers, he was gradually discarding or contradicting Theosophical concepts and terminology, disagreeing with leading Theosophists and talking less about the World Teacher. Instead, he was urging his listeners to find their own answers; public interest and attendance at his speaking engagements remained high. The new emphasis mirrored fundamental changes in Krishnamurti, attributed by his biographers to the experiences that first occurred at Ojai and to Nitya's death,‍ as well as to the development of his own independent thinking. As his disenchantment with the World Teacher Project continued to grow, Krishnamurti undertook a thorough reevaluation of his relationship with it, the Theosophical Society, and Theosophy in general.

Finally on 3 August 1929, at the Ommen Star Camp, he disbanded the Order in front of Besant and about 3,000 members. In his speech dissolving the organization (also broadcast on Dutch radio), Krishnamurti said:

I maintain that Truth is a pathless land, and you cannot approach it by any path whatsoever, by any religion, by any sect. That is my point of view, and I adhere to that absolutely and unconditionally. Truth, being limitless, unconditioned, unapproachable by any path whatsoever, cannot be organized; nor should any organization be formed to lead or to coerce people along any particular path.

— Jiddu Krishnamurti, The Dissolution of the Order of the Star

Despite the changes in Krishnamurti's pronouncements and outlook during the preceding years (and recent rumors of impending dissolution), the ending of the Order and its mission shocked many of its supporters. Prominent Theosophists openly or under various guises turned against Krishnamurti – including Leadbeater, who reputedly stated, "the Coming has gone wrong"; Besant however never wavered, convinced until her death (d. 1933) that Krishnamurti was the World Teacher. While many members of the Society and the Order felt abandoned and betrayed, others supported his new direction and opposed the critical views expressed by Theosophical leaders.

Soon after the dissolution Krishnamurti severed his ties to Theosophy and the Theosophical Society. He denounced the concepts of Saviors, spiritual teachers, leaders, and followers. Vowing to work towards setting humankind "absolutely, unconditionally free", he repudiated all doctrines and theories of inner, spiritual or psychological evolution, including those advanced by Theosophy. Instead, he posited that psychological freedom could be realized only through the understanding of individuals' actual relationships with themselves, society and nature.

Krishnamurti returned to their donors estates, property and funds given to the Order in its various incarnations. He spent the rest of his life (d. 1986) promoting his post-Theosophical message around the world as an independent speaker and writer. He became widely known as an original, influential thinker on philosophical, psychological, and religious subjects.

== Consequences ==
In 1907, the first year for which reliable records were kept, the worldwide membership of the Theosophical Society was estimated at over 15,000. During the following two decades membership suffered due to resignations and organizational splits, but by the mid–1920s it was rising again; it eventually peaked in 1928 at about 45,000 members. The membership of the Order in its various guises kept increasing steadily, yet Krishnamurti's changing message in the period leading to the dissolution may have negatively affected growth. Most members of the Order were also members of the Theosophical Society; consequently, as many as a third of the members of the Society left it "within a few years" of the Order's disbanding. In the opinion of a Krishnamurti biographer, the Society, already in decline for other reasons, "was in disarray" upon the dissolution of the Order. While Theosophical publications and leading members tried to minimize the effect of Krishnamurti's actions and the defunct Order's importance, the "truth ... was that the Theosophical Society had been pole-axed. ... [Krishnamurti] had combatively challenged the central tenet of its beliefs".

The failed Project led to considerable analysis and retrospective evaluations by the Society and prominent Theosophists, at the time and since. It also resulted in governance changes in the main Theosophical entity (the Theosophical Society Adyar), a reorientation of its Esoteric Section, reexamination of parts of its doctrine, and reticence to outside questions regarding the OSE and the World Teacher Project. According to both Theosophical and non-Theosophical observers, Theosophical organizations, especially the Theosophical Society Adyar, by the close of the 20th century had yet to recover from Krishnamurti's rejection and the entire World Teacher affair, and entered the 21st still dealing with their effects.

The Project and its objectives continued to have adherents after the Order's dissolution. Through the remainder of the 20th century and into the 21st, individual Theosophists, quasi-Theosophical offshoots, and various New Age personalities and groups maintained and expanded the notions of World Teacher and of the entity's reappearance, often with significant variations.

Krishnamurti generally avoided the subject in his post-Theosophical life. A book originally published in 1960 includes his account of a short discussion (with an unnamed participant) about the Order's dissolution. In a 1970 interview he reasserted his rejection of the Project, but insisted the motivations of its principals were genuine. He also addressed the Project and his role in it publicly in 1975, stating "... the past is dead, buried and gone". Yet during the last decade of his life the subject was often brought up in probing private discussions with close associates.

Independent evaluations of the Project (often described as a millenarian endeavor) and of its aftermath have also been attempted, especially in light of Krishnamurti's post-Theosophical career and influence as a philosopher and thinker; according to a researcher, such evaluations face questions "without unambiguous answers".

== Cultural references ==
Events and personalities related to the World Teacher Project and the OSE have been portrayed or alluded to in artistic and cultural works.

"The Word of the Master" (Finnish: Mestarin käsky) is a 1925 work for voice and piano by Finnish composer Leevi Madetoja (Op. 71/2). Originally published as "At the Feet of the Master (Alcyone)", its devotional lyrics are based on the eponymous book. The three-minute-long work was republished under the new title in 1929; as of 2002, it was included in contemporary performances on CD-Audio.

"Benares, 1910", an episode in the 1990s US television series The Young Indiana Jones Chronicles created by George Lucas, is taking place in Benares around the time of Krishnamurti's discovery and the formation of the OSE. The hour-long episode loosely (and sympathetically) portrays these and related events. The including series explores the childhood and youth of the fictional character Indiana Jones; in this installment, the protagonist gets to meet the boy Krishnamurti, Besant and Leadbeater. Filmed on location at Benares. The episode originally aired on 3 July 1993, during primetime, on the ABC television network; it achieved modest Nielsen ratings.‍ It was later repackaged in a television film titled The Journey of Radiance (2000), which was also released, along with related documentary material, on DVD-Video (2007).

Blue Dove, a musical theater in two acts, is based on Krishnamurti's life between his discovery by Leadbeater and the start of his career as an independent philosopher and speaker following the dissolution of the Order of the Star. The show, with a running time of two hours and fifteen minutes, premiered in October 2004 at Los Angeles' Ivar Theatre and had a three-week stage run; a 40-minute cast recording was released in 2005. The libretto and plot, by Englishman Peter Wells, employ considerable artistic license in their portrayals of related persons and events.

Order of the Star in the East is the title of an electronic ambient music work by Planet Supreme (an alias/stage name of Swedish composer Karl Ture Rydby) released December 2020 as an audio CD and digital album. The seven-track, 53-minute recording opens with a composition of the same name. The CD liner notes describe the work as an exploration of "inner/outer space ... infused with a broad palette of references".
