= Jiddu Krishnamurti =

Spiritual speaker and writer (1895–1986)

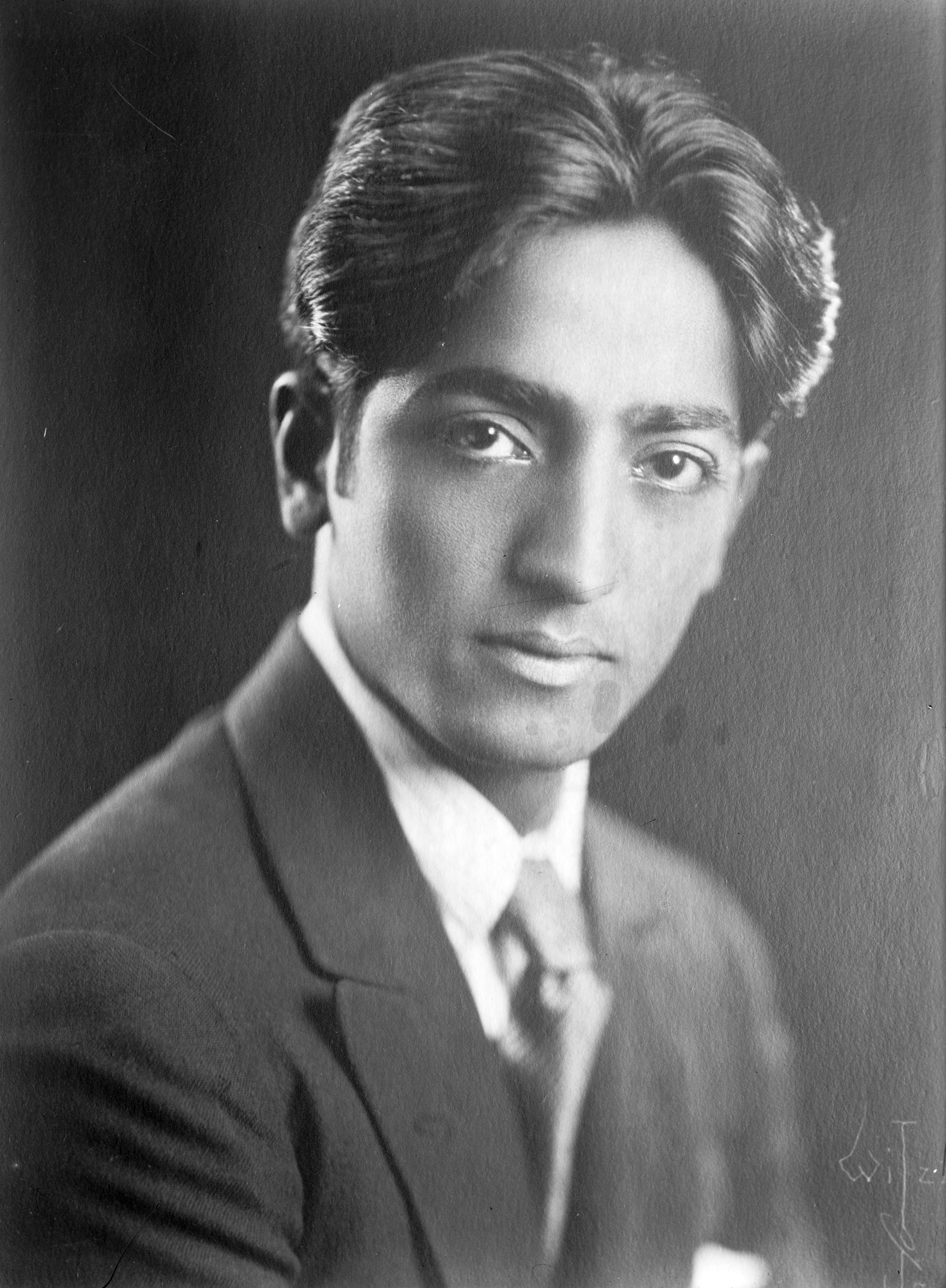
- Krishnamurti in the 1920s
- Born: 11 May 1895; Madanapalle, British India (present-day Andhra Pradesh, India)
- Died: 17 February 1986 (aged 90); Ojai, California, U.S.
- Occupations: Philosopher; author; public speaker
- Relatives: Annie Besant (adoptive parent)

Philosophical work
- Era: 20th-century philosophy
- Region: Eastern philosophy; Indian philosophy
- Institutions: Krishnamurti Foundation (founder)
- Notable works: The First and Last Freedom (1954); Commentaries on Living (1956–1960); Freedom from the Known (1969)

Jiddu Krishnamurti (pronounced /ˈdʒɪduː ˌkrɪʃnəˈmʊərti/; 11 May 1895 – 17 February 1986) was an Indian spiritual figure, speaker, and writer. Adopted by members of the Theosophical Society as a child, Krishnamurti was raised to fill the mantle of the prophesied World Teacher, a role tasked with aiding humankind's spiritual evolution. In 1922, he began to suffer from painful, seizure-like mystical episodes that would produce a lasting change in his perception of reality. (Note: Krishnamurti allowed information about the process and other details of his life to become public knowledge through Lutyens' biography, which included extensive descriptions of the first such occurrences (Lutyens 1975, chs. "18: The Turning Point", "21: Climax of the Process" pp. 152–188 [cumulative]).) (Note: A range of explanations have been given Vernon (2001), p. 124-128. Jayakar (1986), p. 46n and Lutyens (1975), p. 166 provide a frequently given explanation, that it represented the so-called awakening of kundalini – a process that according to Hindu mysticism culminates in transcendent consciousness. Others view it in Freudian terms. Aberbach (1993) contends that the experiences were a projection of Krishnamurti's accumulated grief over the death of his mother. Sloss (1993), pp. 58–61 attributes the onset to Krishnamurti's meditation practice, but also considers the process to be a purely physical event caused by malaria, dissociation accompanied by hallucinations, or the need to receive motherly care, noting that "[i]n the future these symptoms would be witnessed usually by a woman for whom Krashna felt a special involvement or love." She also suggests the possibility of epilepsy. See also Ecstatic seizures, and "Akasha, saga, temporal lobe epilepsy, and aphantasia". 14 May 2024 – via neuromythography.org.. Lutyens (1990) rejects this possibility: According to Lutyens (1990), pp. 45–46, Krishnamurti believed the process was necessary for his spiritual development and not a medical matter or condition. As far as he was concerned, he had encountered Truth; he thought the process was in some way related to this encounter, and to later experiences.) In 1929, he broke from the Theosophy movement and disbanded the Order of the Star in the East, a related organization which had been formed around him. He spent the rest of his life speaking to groups and individuals around the world, hoping to contribute a radical transformation of mankind. (Note: Krishnamurti: "I have no ego!") (Note: Krishnamurti: "Because I am free, unconditioned, whole, not the part, not the relative, but the whole Truth that is eternal, I desire those, who seek to understand me, to be free [...] those who really desire to understand, who are looking to find that which is eternal, without a beginning and without an end, will walk together with greater intensity, will be a danger to everything that is unessential, to unrealities, to shadows. And they will concentrate, they will become the flame, because they understand. Such a body we must create, and that is my purpose. Because of that true friendship – which you do not seem to know – there will be real co-operation on the part of each one. And this not because of authority, not because of salvation, but because you really understand, and hence are capable of living in the eternal. This is a greater thing than all pleasure, than all sacrifice.") (Note: U. G. Krishnamurti described one of their meetings as follows: "We really didn't get along well. Whenever we met we locked horns over some issue or other. For instance, I never shared his concern for the world, or his belief that his teaching would profoundly affect the thoughts and actions of mankind for the next five hundred years – a fantasy of the Theosophist occultists. In one of our meetings I told Krishnamurti, "I am not called upon to save the world." He asked, "The house is on fire – what will you do?" "Pour more gasoline on it and maybe something will rise from the ashes", I remarked. Krishnamurti said, "You are absolutely impossible". Then I said, "You are still a Theosophist. You have never freed yourself from the World Teacher role. There is a story in the Avadhuta Gita which talks of the avadhut who stopped at a wayside inn and was asked by the innkeeper, 'What is your teaching?' He replied, 'There is no teacher, no teaching and no one taught.' And then he walked away. You too repeat these phrases and yet you are so concerned with preserving your teaching for posterity in its pristine purity.")

Krishnamurti asserted that "truth is a pathless land" and advised against following any doctrine, discipline, teacher, guru, or authority, including himself. Nonetheless, during his life he tried to share his insights in "the teachings", urging for a state without conceptual deliberations and thought. (Note: Krishnamurti, the flame of attention, p.107: "Goodness means a way of life which is righteousness, not in terms of religion, or morality or an ethical concept of righteousness, but in terms of one who sees that which is true and that which is false, and sustains that quality of sensitivity that sees it immediate and acts.") In Krishnamurti's perception, such a righteousness was only possible through the practice of passive or choiceless awareness, which he called the essence of "true meditation" in contrast to contrived techniques. (Note: Krishnamurti (1976)"The foundation for true meditation is that passive awareness which is the total freedom from authority and ambition, envy and fear. Meditation has no meaning, no significance whatsoever without this freedom [...] Thought is of knowledge and knowledge cannot free the mind of the fact. Meditation is the choiceless awareness of this complex, which empties the mind of the known.") He gained a wider recognition in the 1950s, after Aldous Huxley had introduced him to his mainstream publisher and the publication of The First and Last Freedom (1954). Many of his talks and writings have been published since, among them Commentaries on Living (1956–60) and Krishnamurti's Notebook (written 1961-62).

A few days before his death, he stated that nobody had understood what energy or intelligence had passed through his body, and that after his death no other such body or intelligence would be found "for many hundred years." (Note: Quoting Krishnamurti from tape-recording made on 7 February 1986: In the morning of 7 May 1986, K. answered a question from Mary Cadogan.Lutyens (1990), p. 159-160, Lutyens (2003), p. 205-206: "When Krishnaji dies what really happen with this extraordinary focus of understanding and energy that is K?" K: "'It is gone. If someone goes wholly into the teachings perhaps they might touch that; but one cannot try to touch it.' Then, after a moment, he added: 'If you all knew what you have missed – that vast emptiness.'" [...] Later that morning, a further response was recorded: "I was telling them this morning – for seventy years that super-energy – no – that immense energy, immense intelligence, has been using this body. I don’t think people realise what tremendous energy and intelligence went through this body – there’s twelve-cylinder engine. And for seventy years – was a pretty long time – and now the body can’t stand any more. Nobody, unless the body has been prepared, very carefully, protected and so on – nobody can understand what went through this body. Nobody. Don’t anybody pretend. Nobody. I repeat this: Nobody amongst us or the public, know what went on. I know they don’t. And now after seventy years it has come to an end. Not that that intelligence and energy – it’s somewhat here, every day, and especially at night. And after seventy years the body can’t stand it – can’t stand any more. It can’t. The Indians have a lot of damned superstitions about this – that you will and the body goes – and all that kind of nonsense. You won’t find another body like this, or that supreme intelligence operating in a body for many hundred years. You won’t see it again. When he goes, it goes. There is no consciousness left behind of that consciousness, of that state. They’ll all pretend or try to imagine they can get into touch with that. Perhaps they will somewhat if they live the teachings. But nobody has done it. Nobody. And so that’s that.") His supporters—working through non-profit foundations in India, the United Kingdom, and the United States—oversee several centres and independent schools based on his educational philosophy and continue to distribute his extensive body of talks, dialogues, and writings in various media formats and languages.

== Biography ==
=== Family background and childhood ===
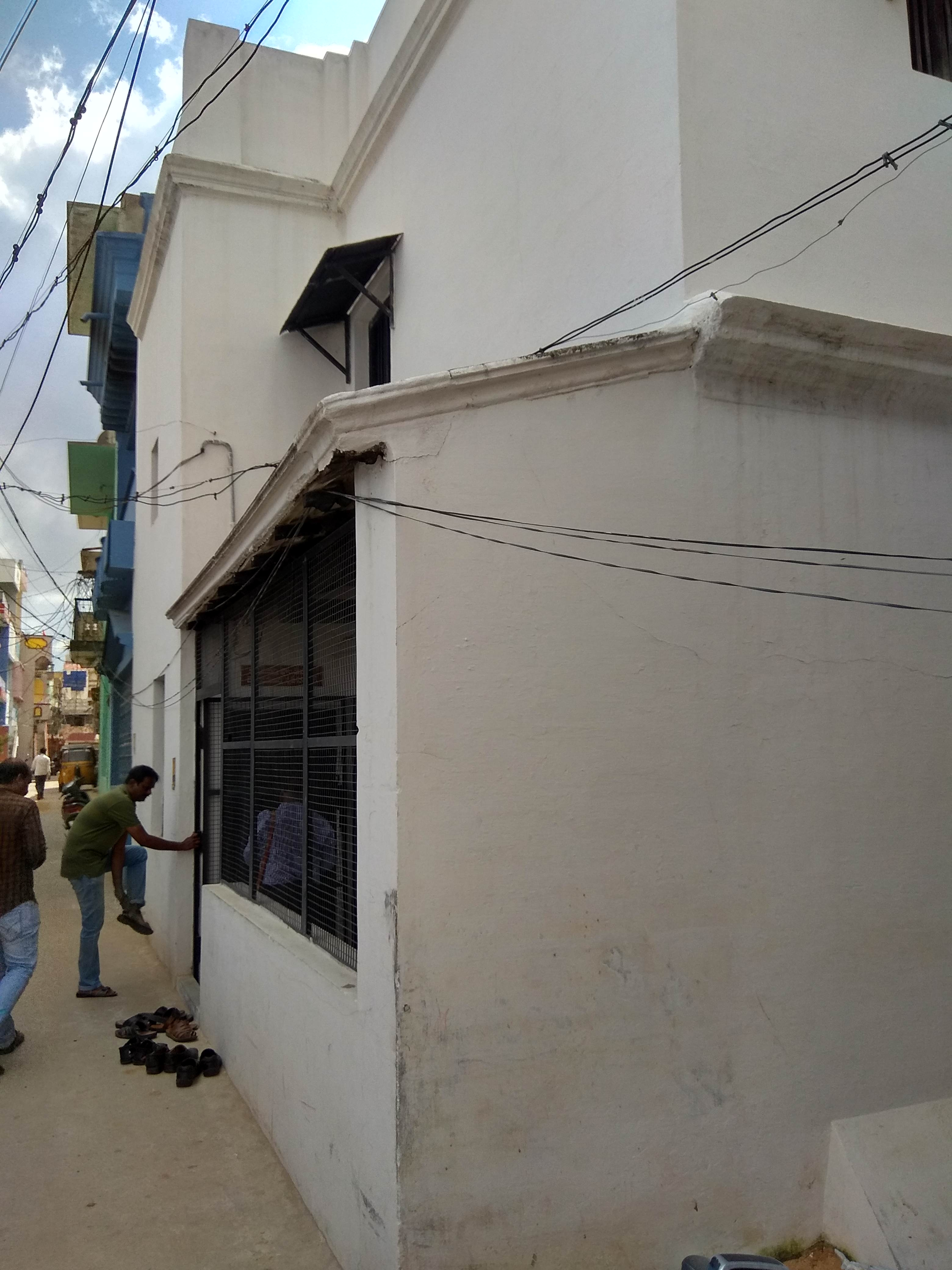
House in Madanapalle, in which Krishnamurti was born

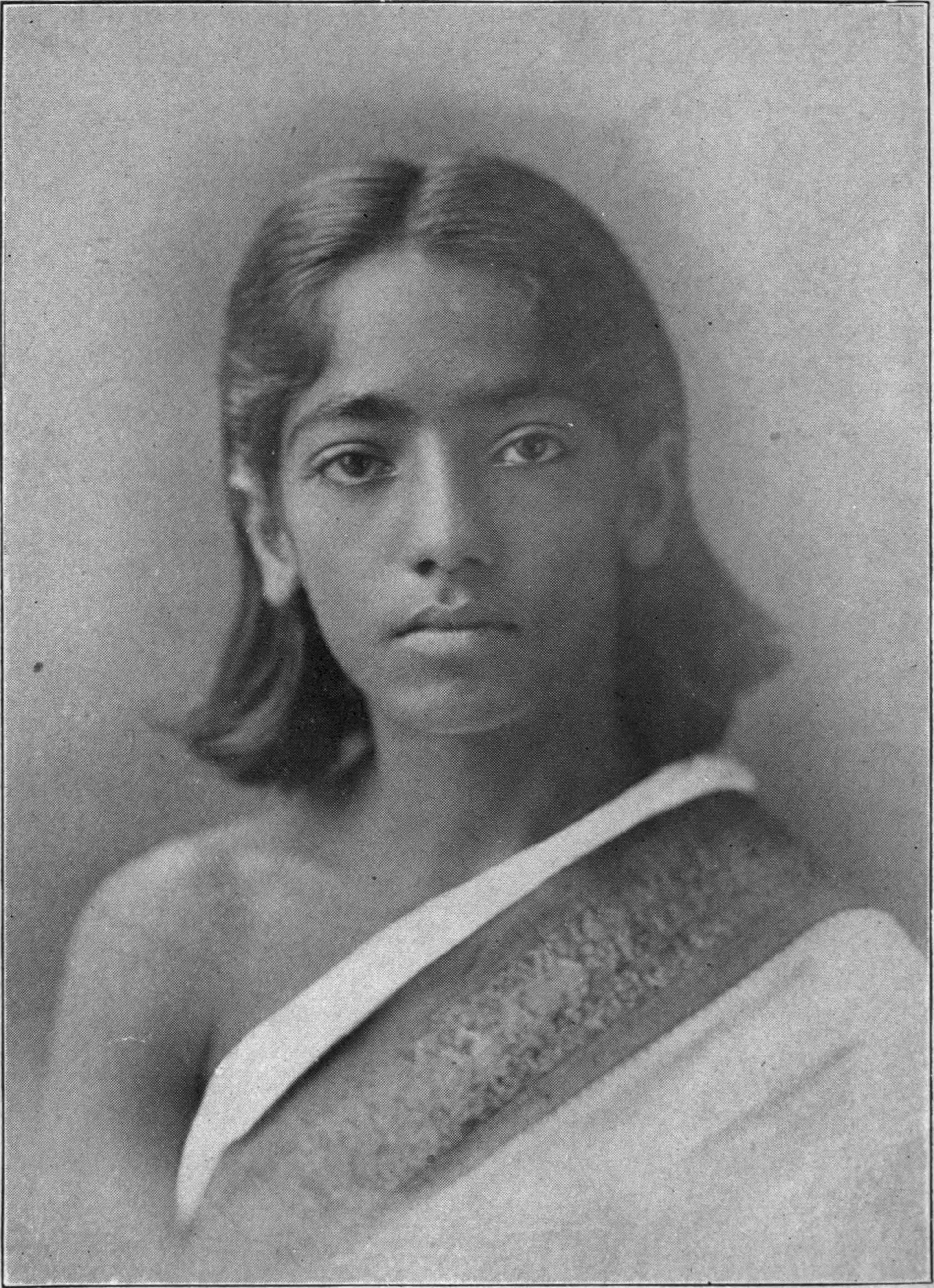
Krishnamurti in 1910

Born during the late British Raj, the date of birth of Krishnamurti is a matter of dispute. Mary Lutyens determines it to be 11 May 1895, but Christine Williams notes the unreliability of birth registrations in that period and points to various claims placing his birth between 4 May 1895 and 25 May 1896. She used calculations based on a published horoscope to derive a date of 11 May 1895 but "retains a measure of scepticism" about it.

His birthplace was the small town of Madanapalle in Madras Presidency (modern-day Annamayya District in Andhra Pradesh). He was born in a Telugu Brahmin family. His father, Jiddu Narayanaiah, was employed as an official of the British colonial administration. Krishnamurti was fond of his mother Sanjeevamma, who died when he was ten. His parents had a total of eleven children, of whom six survived childhood.

In 1903, the family settled in Kadapa, where Krishnamurti had contracted malaria during a previous stay. He suffered recurrent bouts of the disease over many years. A sensitive and sickly child, described as "vague and dreamy", he was often considered intellectually disabled and was beaten regularly at school by his teachers and at home by his father. In memoirs written when he was eighteen years old, Krishnamurti described psychic experiences, such as seeing his sister, who had died in 1904, and his late mother. In childhood, he felt a bond with nature which stayed with him for the rest of his life. Writing in his journal, Krishnamurti states: "He always had this strange lack of distance between himself and the trees, rivers, mountains. It wasn't cultivated."

Krishnamurti's father retired at the end of 1907 and then sought employment at the headquarters of the Theosophical Society at Adyar. Narayanaiah had been a Theosophist since 1882. He was eventually hired by the Society as a clerk, moving there with his family in January 1909. Narayanaiah and his sons were at first assigned to live in a small cottage located just outside the society's compound.

Krishnamurti was a vegetarian from birth, and his family were strict vegetarians. He was an opponent of meat eating, based on ethical and spiritual reasons. Krishnamurti was also a "teetotaler, nonsmoker, and practitioner of yoga."

=== Appropriation by the Theosophical Society ===
In April 1909, Krishnamurti first met Charles Webster Leadbeater, who claimed clairvoyance. Leadbeater had noticed Krishnamurti on the Society's beach on the Adyar River, and was amazed by the "most wonderful aura he had ever seen, without a particle of selfishness in it." (Note: According to occult and Theosophical lore, auras are invisible emanations related to each individual's so-called subtler planes of existence, as well as their normal plane. The ability to discern a person's aura is considered one of the possible effects of clairvoyance. Leadbeater's occult knowledge and abilities were highly respected within the Society.) Ernest Wood, an adjutant of Leadbeater's at the time, who helped Krishnamurti with his homework, considered him to be "particularly dim-witted." Leadbeater was convinced that the boy would become a spiritual teacher and a great orator; the likely "vehicle for the Lord Maitreya" in theosophical doctrine, an advanced spiritual entity periodically appearing on Earth as a World Teacher to guide the evolution of humankind. This World Teacher "was supposed to overshadow Krishnamurti by using his body to communicate with humanity. There was no thought among theosophists of Krishnamurti himself being the World Teacher; he was merely to be the channel through which the World Teacher would speak."

In her biography of Krishnamurti, Pupul Jayakar quotes his reflection on that period in his life some 75 years later: "The boy had always said 'I will do whatever you want.' There was an element of subservience, obedience. The boy was vague, uncertain, woolly; he didn't seem to care what was happening. He was like a vessel with a large hole in it; whatever was put in, went through; nothing remained." Krishnamurti himself described his state of mind as a young boy: "No thought entered his mind. He was watching and listening and nothing else. Thought with its associations never arose. There was no image-making. He often attempted to think but no thought would come."

Following his "discovery" by Leadbeater, Krishnamurti was nurtured by the Theosophical Society in Adyar. Leadbeater and a small number of trusted associates undertook the task of educating, protecting and generally preparing Krishnamurti as the "vehicle" of the expected World Teacher. Krishnamurti (often later called Krishnaji) (Note: The suffix –ji in Hindu names is a sign of affection or respect.) and his younger brother Nityananda (Nitya) were privately tutored at the theosophical compound in Madras, and later exposed to an opulent life among a segment of European high society as they continued their education abroad. Despite his history of problems with schoolwork and concerns about his capacities and physical condition, the 14 year-old Krishnamurti was able to speak and write competently in English within six months. Lutyens says that later in life Krishnamurti came to view his "discovery" as a life-saving event. When he was asked what he thought would have happened to him if he had not been discovered by Leadbeater, he unhesitatingly replied: "I would have died".

During this time, Krishnamurti had developed a strong bond with Annie Besant and came to view her as a surrogate mother. His father, who had initially assented to Besant's legal guardianship of Krishnamurti, was pushed into the background by the swirl of attention around his son. In 1912, he sued Besant to annul the guardianship agreement. After a protracted legal battle, Besant took custody of Krishnamurti and Nitya. As a result of this separation from family and home, Krishnamurti and his brother (whose relationship had always been very close) became more dependent on each other, and in the following years often travelled together.

In 1911, the Theosophical Society established the Order of the Star in the East (OSE) to prepare the world for the expected appearance of the World Teacher. Krishnamurti was named as its head, with senior theosophists assigned various other positions. Membership was open to anybody who accepted the doctrine of the "Coming of the World Teacher". Controversy soon erupted, both within the Theosophical Society and outside it, in Hindu circles and the Indian press. (Note: Lutyens (1975), p. 40–63 (cumulative): The news regarding Krishnamurti and the World Teacher was not universally welcomed by Theosophists and led to upheavals in the Society; Lutyens (1983), p. 15–19, 40, 56. Part of the controversy was Leadbeater's role: He had a history of being frequently in the company of young boys—pupils under his spiritual and Theosophical instruction—and there was gossip of child abuse, although no accusations were ever proven.)

=== Preparation as the World Teacher ===
Mary Lutyens, a biographer, says that there was a time when Krishnamurti believed that he was to become the World Teacher after correct spiritual and secular guidance and education. Another biographer describes the daily program imposed on him by Leadbeater and his associates, which included rigorous exercise and sports, tutoring in a variety of school subjects, theosophical and religious lessons, yoga and meditation, as well as instruction in proper hygiene and in the ways of British society and culture. At the same time, Leadbeater assumed the role of guide in a parallel mystical instruction of Krishnamurti; the existence and progress of this instruction was at the time known only to a select few.

Although he showed a natural aptitude for sports, Krishnamurti struggled with formal schooling and was not academically inclined. He eventually gave up university education after several attempts at admission. He did take to foreign languages, in time speaking several with some fluency.

His public image, cultivated by the theosophists, "was to be characterized by a well-polished exterior, a sobriety of purpose, a cosmopolitan outlook and an otherworldly, almost beatific detachment in his demeanor." Demonstrably, "All of these can be said to have characterized Krishnamurti's public image to the end of his life." It was apparently clear early on that he "possessed an innate personal magnetism, not of a warm physical variety, but nonetheless emotive in its austerity, and inclined to inspire veneration." However, as he was growing up, Krishnamurti showed signs of adolescent rebellion and emotional instability, chafing at the regimen imposed on him, visibly uncomfortable with the publicity surrounding him, and occasionally expressing doubts about the future prescribed for him. (Note: Lutyens (1975), "Chapter 10: Doubts and Difficulties" through "Chapter 15: In Love" pp. 80–132 [cumulative].)

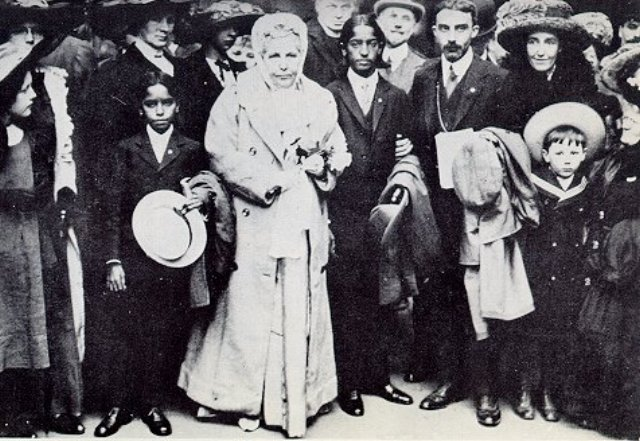
Krishnamurti in England in 1911 with his brother Nitya, Annie Besant, and George Arundale

Krishnamurti and Nitya were taken to England in April 1911. During this trip, Krishnamurti gave his first public speech to members of the OSE in London. His first writings had also started to appear, published in booklets by the Theosophical Society and in theosophical and OSE-affiliated journals. (Note: Lutyens (1997), p. 46, 74–75, 126. Krishnamurti was named editor of The Herald of the Star, the official bulletin of the OSE. His position was mainly as a figurehead, yet he often wrote "editorial notes", which along with his other contributions helped the magazine's circulation; see, for example, Krishnamurti (1926).) Between 1911 and the start of World War I in 1914, the brothers visited several other European countries, always accompanied by theosophist chaperones. Meanwhile, Krishnamurti had for the first time acquired a measure of personal financial independence, thanks to Mary Melissa Hoadley Dodge, a wealthy American benefactress then resident in England.

After the war, Krishnamurti embarked on a series of lectures, meetings and discussions around the world, related to his duties as the Head of the OSE, accompanied by Nitya, by then the Organizing Secretary of the Order. Krishnamurti also continued writing. (Note: See Jiddu Krishnamurti bibliography.) The content of his talks and writings revolved around the work of the Order and of its members in preparation for the "coming". He was initially described as a halting, hesitant and repetitive speaker, but his delivery and confidence improved, and he gradually took command of the organization's meetings.

In 1921, Krishnamurti formed a romantic attachment to Helen Knothe, a 17-year-old American, whose family associated with the theosophists. The experience was tempered by the realisation that his work and expected life-mission precluded what would otherwise be considered normal relationships and by the mid-1920s the two of them had drifted apart. She later said that Krishnamurti's attitudes were conditioned by privilege, because he had been supported, even pampered, by devoted followers from the time of his "discovery" by the theosophists. She also said that he was at such an "elevated" level that he was incapable of forming "normal personal relationships".

=== Taking residence at Ojai, 'the process', and growing expectations ===
In 1922, Krishnamurti and Nitya travelled from Sydney to California. In California, they stayed at a cottage in the Ojai Valley. It was thought that the area's climate would be beneficial to Nitya, who had been diagnosed with tuberculosis. Nitya's failing health became a concern for Krishnamurti. At Ojai they met Rosalind Williams, a young American who became close to them both, and who was later to play a significant role in Krishnamurti's life. For the first time, the brothers were without immediate supervision by their Theosophical Society minders. They found the Valley to be very agreeable. Eventually, a trust, formed by supporters, bought a cottage and surrounding property there for them. This became Krishnamurti's official residence.

==== 'The process' ====
In Ojai in August and September 1922, Krishnamurti went through a series of "disturbing physical symptoms that progressed from discomfort to pain," during which he mistook Rosalind for his mother, interpreted by some of his followers as intense "life-changing" experiences and signs of his advancement along "the path". The initial events happened in two distinct phases: First a three-day acute pain in the neck accompanied by a mystical experience, and two weeks later, a longer-lasting condition that Krishnamurti and those around him later referred to as "the process". This condition recurred, at frequent intervals and with varying intensity, until his death.

According to Krishnamurti, Nitya, Rosalind, and Mr. Warrington, it started on 17 August 1922, when Krishnamurti complained of a sharp pain at the nape of his neck. Over the next two days, the symptoms worsened, with increasing pain and sensitivity, loss of appetite, and occasional delirious ramblings. He seemed to lapse into unconsciousness but later recounted that he was very much aware of his surroundings, and that while in that state on 19 August 1922, he had "the first most extraordinary experience," in which he felt "at one with his surroundings." (Note: Lutyens (1983), p. 170: "There was a man mending the road; the man was myself; the picaxe he held was myself; the very stone he was breaking up was a part of me.") The following day, the symptoms and the experience intensified, and he had an out-of-body experience, feeling "the vibrations of Lord Buddha," experiencing peace and a "profound calmness." Krishnamurti also wrote that he had "touched compassion which heals all sorrow and suffering; it is not for myself, but for the world". (Note: Sloss (1993), p. 62 comments: "Krishna's experience [...] can bestow no authority to lead, only to share, and by sharing to offer others the hope of the sense of reality imparted." Krishnamurti himself said, in response to Rom Landau: "You are right. They live in the plains and I live, as you call it, on the mountaintop; but I hope that ever more and more human beings will be able to endure the clear air of the mountain top [...] How can you expect me to be concerned with what should be done or how it should be done? If you have once lived on a mountaintop, you cannot return to the plains. You can only try to make other people feel the purity of the air and enjoy the infinite prospect, and become one with the beauty of life there." Landau (1939), p. 287)

Following – and apparently related to – these events the "the process" started to affect him as a regular, almost nightly occurrence. Later it resumed intermittently, with varying degrees of pain, physical discomfort and sensitivity, occasionally with lapses into a childlike state, and sometimes an apparent fading out of consciousness, explained as either his body giving in to pain or his mind "going off". (Note: Lutyens (1975), p. 152–188, Chapter 18: The Turning Point through Chapter 21: Climax of the Process [cumulative]: The use of the term "going off" in the accounts of the early occurrences of 'the process' apparently signified so-called out-of-body experiences (Lutyens 1990, p. 134–135). In later use the meaning of "going off" was more nuanced.)

==== 'The otherness' ====
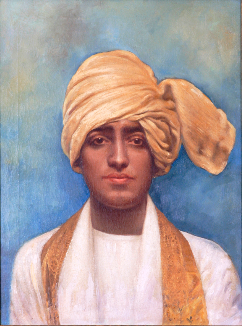
Krishnamurti by Tomás Povedano

These experiences were accompanied or followed by what was interchangeably described as "the benediction", "the immensity", "the sacredness", "the vastness" and, most often, "the otherness" or "the other". It was a state related to, but distinct from the process. According to Lutyens it is evident from notebooks that this experience of otherness was "with him almost continuously" during his life, and gave him "a sense of being protected". Krishnamurti described it in a notebook as typically following an acute experience of the process, for example, on awakening the next day:

... woke up early with that strong feeling of otherness, of another world that is beyond all thought ... there is a heightening of sensitivity. Sensitivity, not only to beauty but also to all other things. The blade of grass was astonishingly green; that one blade of grass contained the whole spectrum of colour; it was intense, dazzling and such a small thing, so easy to destroy ...

This experience of otherness was present with him in daily events:

It is strange how during one or two interviews that strength, that power filled the room. It seemed to be in one's eyes and breath. It comes into being, suddenly and most unexpectedly, with a force and intensity that is quite overpowering, and at other times it's there quietly and serenely. But it's there, whether one wants it or not. There is no possibility of getting used to it for it has never been nor will it ever be ..."

==== Secretiveness and explanations ====
Lutyens (1975) revealed the existence of the process in The Years of Awakening, the first volume of her biography of Krishnamurti. The existence and history of these experiences had remained unknown outside of the Theosophical Society leadership and Krishnamurti's circle of close associates and friends.

Roland Vernon, in his biography, states that previous attempts (by others) at revealing details from his past, including these reputed experiences, were suppressed by Krishnamurti. According to Vernon, Krishnamurti "believed, with good reason, that the sensationalism of his early story would cloud the public's perception of his [then] current work". Krishnamurti himself gave the following description of his development to Rom Landau in 1935:

Rom Landau: How did you come to that state of unity with everything?

Krishnamurti: People have asked me about that before, and I always feel that they expect to hear the dramatic account of some sudden miracle through which I suddenly became one with the universe. Of course, nothing of the sort happened. My inner awareness was always there; though it took me time to feel it more and more clearly; and equally it took time to find words that would at all describe it.
It was not a sudden flash, but a slow yet constant clarification of something that was always there. It did not grow, as people often think. Nothing can grow in us that is of spiritual importance. It has to be there in all its fullness, and then the only thing that happens is that we become more and more aware of it. It is our intellectual reaction and nothing else that needs time to become more articulate, more definite.

However Krishnamurti often hinted at otherness-like states in later talks and discussions. During Krishnamurti's later years, the nature and provenance of the continuing process often came up as a subject in private discussions between himself and associates, also stating that the experience of the otherness continued as he was nearing death. These discussions shed some light on the subject but were ultimately inconclusive. (Note: Some discussions with close associates are summarized or excerpted in Lutyens 1983, pp. 186, 224–231; Jayakar 1986, pp. 293, 364, 391–392, 409, 438–440; Zimbalist 2014, especially "Issue 29" forwards, contains numerous references; in such discussions, Krishnamurti is reputed to have often made tentative or ambiguous statements about his inner experiences and aspects of the otherness: "I don't know, and I don't ask" (Zimbalist (2014), "Issue 34".); reputedly he once said of his Notebook manuscript, "It's not my book. I didn't write it." (Zimbalist (2014), "Issue 31".); he believed that these experiences would stop once his physical condition deteriorated to the point where he could no longer travel and hold talks, and was mystified by the reputed continuing presence of the other, perceived while an invalid, days before his death (Zimbalist (2014), "Issue 89".).)

Since the initial occurrences in 1922, several explanations have been proposed for these experiences of Krishnamurti's, including epilepsy. Leadbeater and other theosophists expected the "vehicle" to have certain paranormal experiences but were nevertheless mystified by these developments.

==== Growing expectations ====
As news of these experiences spread, rumours concerning the messianic status of Krishnamurti reached fever pitch as the 1925 Theosophical Society Convention was planned, on the 50th anniversary of its founding. There were expectations of significant happenings. Paralleling the increasing adulation was Krishnamurti's growing discomfort with it. In related developments, prominent theosophists and their factions within the Society were trying to position themselves favourably relative to the "coming", which was widely rumoured to be approaching. He stated that "too much of everything is bad." "Extraordinary" pronouncements of spiritual advancement were made by various parties, disputed by others, and the internal theosophical politics further alienated Krishnamurti.

==== Death of Nitya ====
Nitya's persistent health problems periodically resurfaced throughout this time. On 13 November 1925, at age 27, he died in Ojai from complications of influenza and tuberculosis. Despite Nitya's poor health, his death was unexpected, and it fundamentally shook Krishnamurti's belief in theosophy and in the leaders of the Theosophical Society. He had received their assurances regarding Nitya's health, and had come to believe that "Nitya was essential for [his] life-mission and therefore he would not be allowed to die," a belief shared by Annie Besant and Krishnamurti's circle. Jayakar wrote that "his belief in the Masters and the hierarchy had undergone a total revolution." Moreover, Nitya had been the "last surviving link to his family and childhood. ... The only person to whom he could talk openly, his best friend and companion." According to eyewitness accounts, the news "broke him completely." However, 12 days after Nitya's death he was "immensely quiet, radiant, and free of all sentiment and emotion"; "there was not a shadow ... to show what he had been through."

=== Break with the Theosophical Society ===
Over the next few years, Krishnamurti's self-awareness and alienation from the theosophical worldview continued to develop. He lost his faith in "The Masters", and new concepts appeared in his talks, discussions and correspondence, together with an evolving vocabulary that was increasingly free of theosophical terminology. His new direction reached a climax in 1929, when he rebuffed attempts by Leadbeater and Besant to continue with the Order of the Star.

Krishnamurti dissolved the Order during the annual Star Camp at Ommen, the Netherlands, on 3 August 1929. He stated that he had made his decision after "careful consideration" during the previous two years, and turned against the Theosophical Society's elaborate worldview of spiritual progress, stating that:

I maintain that truth is a pathless land, and you cannot approach it by any path whatsoever, by any religion, by any sect. That is my point of view, and I adhere to that absolutely and unconditionally. Truth, being limitless, unconditioned, unapproachable by any path whatsoever, cannot be organized; nor should any organization be formed to lead or coerce people along a particular path. ... This is no magnificent deed, because I do not want followers, and I mean this. The moment you follow someone you cease to follow Truth. I am not concerned whether you pay attention to what I say or not. I want to do a certain thing in the world and I am going to do it with unwavering concentration. I am concerning myself with only one essential thing: to set man free. I desire to free him from all cages, from all fears, and not to found religions, new sects, nor to establish new theories and new philosophies.

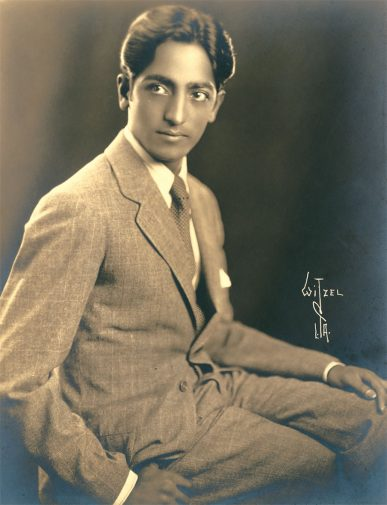
Krishnamurti in the early 1920s

Following the dissolution, prominent Theosophists turned against Krishnamurti, including Leadbeater who is said to have stated, "the Coming had gone wrong." Krishnamurti had denounced all organised belief, the notion of gurus, and the whole teacher-follower relationship, vowing instead to work on setting people "absolutely, unconditionally free." There is no record of his explicitly denying he was the World Teacher; whenever he was asked to clarify his position, he either asserted that the matter was irrelevant, (Note: Krishnamurti (1972), p. 9: "I think we shall have incessant wrangles over the corpse of Krishnamurti if we discuss this or that, wondering who is now speaking. Someone asked me: 'Do tell me if it is you speaking or someone else'. I said: 'I really do not know and it does not matter'." From the 1927 "Question and answer session" at Ommen. (Note: weblink in reference is not at official Krishnamurti-related or Theosophical Society website).) or gave answers that, as he stated, were "purposely vague". (Note: Krishnamurti (1928a), p. 43: "I am going to be purposely vague, because although I could quite easily make it definite, it is not my intention to do so. Because once you define a thing it becomes dead." Krishnamurti on the World Teacher, from "Who brings the truth," an address delivered at Ommen 2 August 1927. (Note: weblink in reference is not at official Krishnamurti-related or Theosophical Society website. Link-specific content verified against original at New York Public Library Main Branch, "YAM p.v. 519" [call no..)

Some historical evidence suggests that the ongoing changes in Krishnamurti's outlook had begun before the dissolution of the Order of the Star. The subtlety of the new distinctions on the World Teacher issue was lost on many of his admirers, who were already bewildered or distraught because of the changes in Krishnamurti's outlook, vocabulary and pronouncements – among them Besant and Mary Lutyens' mother, Lady Emily, who had a very close relationship with him. He soon disassociated himself from the Theosophical Society and its teachings and practices, (Note: Lutyens considers the last remaining tie with Theosophy to have been severed in 1933, with the death of Besant. He had resigned from the Society in 1930.) yet he remained on cordial terms with some of its members and ex-members throughout his life.

Krishnamurti resigned from the various trusts and other organisations that were affiliated with the defunct Order of the Star, including the Theosophical Society. He returned the money and properties donated to the Order, among them a castle in the Netherlands and 5,000 acres (2,023 ha) of land, to their donors.

=== Middle years – Arya Vihara and extra-marital affair ===
From 1930 through 1944, Krishnamurti engaged in speaking tours and issuing publications under the auspice of the Star Publishing Trust (SPT), which he had founded with Desikacharya Rajagopal, a close associate and friend from the Order of the Star. (Note: Born in India in 1900 and of Brahmin descent, Rajagopal had moved in Krishnamurti's circle since early youth. Although regarded as an excellent editor and organizer, he was also known for his difficult personality and high-handed manner. Upon Nitya's death, he had promised Besant that he would look after Krishnamurti. See Henri Methorst, Krishnamurti A Spiritual Revolutionary, Edwin Publishing House, 2003, ch 12.) Ojai was the base of operations for the new enterprise, where Krishnamurti, Rajagopal and Rosalind Williams (who had married Rajagopal in 1927) resided in the house known as Arya Vihara (meaning "Realm of the Aryas", i.e. those noble by righteousness in Sanskrit). The business and organizational aspects of the SPT were administered chiefly by D. Rajagopal, as Krishnamurti devoted his time to speaking and meditation.

The Rajagopals' marriage was not a happy one, and the two became physically estranged after the 1931 birth of their daughter, Radha. Krishnamurti's friendship with Rosalind became a love affair. According to Radha Rajagopal Sloss, the relationship between Krishnamurti and Rosalind began in 1932 and it endured for about twenty-five years. Radha Sloss, daughter of Rajagopal, wrote about this in her book Lives in the Shadow with J. Krishnamurti. (Note: Radha's account of the relationship, Lives in the Shadow With J. Krishnamurti, was first published in England by Bloomsbury Publishing Ltd. in 1991, and was soon followed by a rebuttal volume written by Mary Lutyens, Krishnamurti and the Rajagopals, Krishnamurti Foundation of America, 1996, in which she acknowledges the relationship but was never confirmed by Krishnamurti himself. Mark Lee: "I heard it from Erna Lillifelt, who learned it from Krishnaji. Krishnaji has told Mary Zimbalist and Erna Lilliefelt that there was something that Rajagopal had against him. They asked him what it was. And he said 'I had sexual relations with that woman'." See Padmanabhan (2015), p. ch. 8.) According to Radha Rajagopal Sloss, Krishnamurti was dependent on his followers to support his way of life, and needed to uphold his image of a celibate guru to continue this support and way of life. (Note: The two also shared an interest in education: Krishnamurti helped to raise Radha, and the need to provide her with a suitable educational environment led to the founding of the Happy Valley School in 1946. The school has since re-established itself as an independent institution operating as the "Besant Hill School Of Happy Valley".. See Sloss (1991a), ch 19.) This has been contested by Lutyens.

During the 1930s, Krishnamurti spoke in Europe, Latin America, India, Australia and the United States. He did not speak publicly for a period of about four years between 1940 and 1944. During this time, he lived and worked at Arya Vihara, which during World War II operated as a largely self-sustaining farm, with its surplus goods donated for relief efforts in Europe. Of the years spent in Ojai during the war, he later said: "I think it was a period of no challenge, no demand, no outgoing. I think it was a kind of everything held in; and when I left Ojai it all burst."

English author Aldous Huxley lived nearby; he met Krishnamurti in 1938 and the two men became close friends. They held common concerns about the imminent conflict in Europe which they viewed as the outcome of the pernicious influence of nationalism. Krishnamurti's stance on WWII was often construed as pacifism and even subversion during a time of patriotic fervor in the United States, and for a time he came under the surveillance of the FBI.

Huxley encouraged Krishnamurti to write, and also introduced his work to Harper, Huxley's own publisher. This eventually led to the addition of Krishnamurti in the publisher's roster of authors; Radha Rajagopal Sloss, daughter of D. Rajagopal, Krishnamurti's business manager at the time, states that Huxley introduced her father to the publisher. She adds that Krishnamurti had little interest in his manuscripts or other records of his work; this lack of interest by Krishnamurti is also remarked upon by his biographers. Until that time Krishnamurti, works were published by small or specialist presses, or in-house by a variety of Krishnamurti-related organizations.

Krishnamurti broke the hiatus from public speaking in May 1944 with a series of talks in Ojai. These talks, and subsequent materials, were published by Krishnamurti Writings Inc. (KWINC), the successor organisation to the SPT. This was to be the new central Krishnamurti-related entity worldwide, whose sole purpose was the dissemination of the teaching. Initially, Krishnamurti (along with Rajagopal and others) was a trustee of KWINC. Eventually he ceased being a trustee, leaving Rajagopal as President – a turn of events that according to Lutyens, constituted "...a circumstance that was to have most unhappy consequences." He had remained in contact with associates from India, and in the autumn of 1947 embarked on a speaking tour there, attracting a new following of young intellectuals. (Note: These included former freedom campaigners from the Indian Independence Movement, See Vernon (2001), p. 219) On this trip he encountered the Mehta sisters, Pupul and Nandini, who became lifelong associates and confidants. The sisters also attended to Krishnamurti throughout a 1948 recurrence of the "process" in Ootacamund. In Poona in 1948, Krishnamurti met B.K.S. Iyengar, who taught him yoga practices every morning for the next three months, then on and off for twenty years.

=== Later years – wider recognition, legal battles, and final evaluation ===
Krishnamurti in 1970

Krishnamurti continued speaking in public lectures, group discussions and with concerned individuals around the world. In 1954, The First and Last Freedom was published, which was instrumental in broadening Krishnamurti's audience and exposing his ideas. It was one of the first Krishnamurti titles in the world of mainstream, commercial publishing, where its success helped establish him as a viable author. It consists of edited excerpts from his public talks and discussions, and includes examinations of subjects that were, or became, recurrent themes in his exposition: the nature of the self, belief, investigations into fear and desire, the relationship between thinker and thought, the concept of choiceless awareness, the function of the mind, etc.

In the early 1960s, he made the acquaintance of physicist David Bohm, whose philosophical and scientific concerns regarding the essence of the physical world, and the psychological and sociological state of mankind, found parallels in Krishnamurti's philosophy. The two men soon became close friends and started a common inquiry in the form of personal dialogues – and in group discussions with other participants – that continued, periodically, over more than two decades. (Note: Bohm would eventually serve as a Krishnamurti Foundation trustee.) Several of these discussions were published in the form of books or as parts of books, along with audio recordings, and introduced a wider audience (among scientists) to Krishnamurti's ideas. The long friendship with Bohm went through a rocky interval in later years, and although they overcame their differences and remained friends until Krishnamurti's death, the relationship did not regain its previous intensity. (Note: Their falling out was partly due to questions about Krishnamurti's private behaviour, especially his long and secret love affair with Rosalind Williams-Rajagopal, then unknown to the general public. After their falling out, Bohm criticised certain aspects of the teaching on philosophical, methodological, and psychological grounds. He also criticised what he described as Krishnamurti's occasional "verbal manipulations" when deflecting challenges. Eventually, he questioned some of the reasoning about the nature of thought and self, although he never abandoned his belief that "Krishnamurti was onto something". See Infinite Potential: The Life and times of David Bohm, by F. David Peat, Addison Wesley, 1997.)

Krishnamurti's once close relationship with the Rajagopals had deteriorated to the point where he took D. Rajagopal to court to recover donated property and funds, as well as publication rights for his works, manuscripts, and personal correspondence, that were in Rajagopal's possession. (Note: D. Rajagopal was the head or co-head of a number of successive corporations and trusts, set up after the dissolution of the Order of the Star and chartered to publish Krishnamurti's talks, discussions and other writings.) The litigation and ensuing cross complaints, which formally began in 1971, continued for many years. Much property and materials were returned to Krishnamurti during his lifetime; the parties to this case finally settled all other matters in 1986, shortly after his death. (Note: Formation of the Krishnamurti Foundation of America and the Lawsuits Which Took Place Between 1968 and 1986 to Recover Assets for Krishnamurti's Work, by Erna Lilliefelt, Krishnamurti Foundation of America, 1995. The complicated settlement dissolved the K & R Foundation (a previous entity), and transferred assets to the Krishnamurti Foundation of America (KFA). However certain disputed documents remained in the possession of Rajagopal, and he received partial repayment for his attorney's fees.) Krishnamurti' stance raised doubts in long-time friends and devotees, some of whom got the impression that he was a divided personality unable to live according to his own teachings – raising the question: "If he cannot live it, who can?"

In 1984 and 1985, Krishnamurti spoke to an invited audience at the United Nations in New York, under the auspices of the Pacem in Terris Society chapter at the United Nations. In October 1985, he visited India for the last time, holding a number of what came to be known as "farewell" talks and discussions between then and January 1986. These last talks included the fundamental questions he had been asking through the years, as well as newer concerns about advances in science and technology, and their effect on humankind. Krishnamurti had commented to friends that he did not wish to invite death, but was not sure how long his body would last (he had already lost considerable weight), and once he could no longer talk, he would have "no further purpose". In his final talk, on 4 January 1986, in Madras, he again invited the audience to examine with him the nature of inquiry, the effect of technology, the nature of life and meditation, and the nature of creation.

Krishnamurti in 1986 during his final talks

Krishnamurti was also concerned about his legacy, about being unwittingly turned into some personage whose teachings had been handed down to special individuals, rather than the world at large. He did not want anybody to pose as an interpreter of the teaching. He warned his associates on several occasions that they were not to present themselves as spokesmen on his behalf, or as his successors after his death.

A few days before his death, in a final statement, possibly in response to a question by associate Mary Cadogan, he stated an "immense energy and intelligence went through this body." Nobody had understood what his body went through, and after his death, this consciousness would be gone, and no other body would support it "for many hundred years." He further added that, "Perhaps they will somewhat if they live the teachings. But nobody has done it. Nobody. And so that's that."

=== Death ===
Krishnamurti died of pancreatic cancer on 17 February 1986, at the age of 90. The announcement by KFT (Krishnamurti Foundation Trust) referred to the course of his health condition until the moment of death. The first signs came almost nine months before his death, when he felt very tired. In October 1985, he went from Bramdean, England (Brockwood Park School) to India, and after that, he suffered from exhaustion and fevers, and he lost weight. Krishnamurti decided to return to Ojai (10 January 1986) after his last talks in Madras, which required a 24-hour flight. Once he arrived at Ojai, he underwent medical tests that revealed he was suffering from pancreatic cancer. The cancer was untreatable, surgically or otherwise, so Krishnamurti decided to go back to his home in Ojai, where he spent his last days. Friends and professionals nursed him. His mind was clear until the last moment. Krishnamurti died on 17 February 1986, at 10 minutes past midnight, California time. In accordance with his wishes, no memorial service was conducted. His ashes were divided into three parts: for Ojai, India and England. In India, they were immersed in River Ganga in Varanasi, Gangotri, and in the ocean Adyar beach.

== Schools ==
Krishnamurti founded five schools in India, the oldest being Rishi Valley School founded in 1928 in Andhra Pradesh, ten miles from Madanapalle, his birthplace. He also founded one in England, Brockwood Park School in 1969, and one in California, Oak Grove School. When asked, he enumerated the following as his educational aims:

1. Global outlook: A vision of the whole as distinct from the part; there should never be a sectarian outlook, but always a holistic outlook free from all prejudice.
2. Concern for man and the environment: Humanity is part of nature, and if nature is not cared for, it will boomerang on man. Only the right education, and deep affection between people everywhere, will resolve many problems including the environmental challenges.
3. Religious spirit, which includes the scientific temper: The religious mind is alone, not lonely. It is in communion with people and nature.

The Krishnamurti Foundations, established in India, USA and England in the 1960s now manage seven schools in India and abroad.

== 'The teaching' – self-observation and 'vast emptiness' ==
A keen observer of the beauty of nature, Krishnamurti had strong convictions about the brutality and self-destruction of humanity, urging for an immediate righteousness without conceptual deliberations and thought. In Krishnamurti's perception, such a righteousness was only possible through a radical transformation of the mind, wholeheartedly but with detachment observing its workings and limitations. He said an "immense intelligence" used his body to convey this message to mankind, but said at his deathbed that nobody had experienced this intelligence the way he had.

=== Self-perception: vast emptiness and saviour-role ===
Peter Michel notes that "Mystical experiences determined Krishnamurti's entire life, and cannot be separated from his teachings." According to Krishnamurti:

an "immense energy and intelligence went through this body," a consciousness which he called "the otherness."

It manifested in the absence of thought, and to Mary Lutyens he said:

"If I was writing the life, I would start with the vacant mind," (Note: Krishnamurti: “No thought entered his mind. He was watching and listening and nothing else. Thought with its associations never arose. There was no image-making. He often attempted to think but no thought would come.”) while at his deathbed he referred to "that vast emptiness."
Krishnamurti saw himself as free and unconditioned, imploring his audiences to understand his state of being and aiming for such like-minded spirits to transform the world; and he often referred to the totality of his work as the teachings, and not as my teachings. He once likened himself to Thomas Edison, suggesting that he had blazed a trail for others to follow. Those who came after wouldn't need his special gifts; they would only need to turn the switch.

=== The Teachings ===
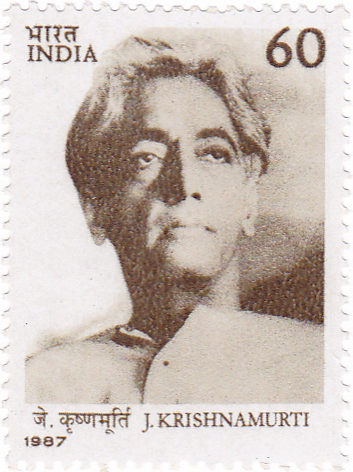
Krishnamurti on a 1987 Indian stamp

According to the Krishnamurti Foundations, the core of Krishnamurti's teachings is contained in his 1929 statement, in which he rejected the Theosophical Society and their elaborate system of spiritual progress guided by "Masters". In this speech, Krishnamurti asserted that "truth is a pathless land" and advised against following any doctrine, discipline, teacher, guru, or authority, including himself. The "Core of the Teachings", produced for his biography, also refers to freedom from conditioning, observation without the observer, the ending of conflict, the nature of relationship, freedom from fear and sorrow, meditation as awareness, love and compassion, and the "religious mind".

Shai Tubali notes that Krishnamurti's teachings were essentially dialogical in nature, aiming at "transformative dialogue". Yet, as summarized by John Algeo, Peter Michel observes that "real dialogue is conspicuously lacking; such apparent invitations [to look into this together] were rhetorical introductions to a monologue." However, Krishnamurti held dialogues with individuals, groups and the public for more than five decades. According to Krishnamurti, a radical transformation was necessary, a transformation which could be achieved by anyone, without the aid of a teacher or guru.

One has to live "psychologically alone [...] without depending on anything or anyone," living in complete attention to observe and let go of the contents of consciousness.

Asked to summarize the teaching in one sentence, Krishnamurti answered, "Attempt without effort to live with death in futureless silence," elaborating that:

"death is the end of all you are afraid to lose: your attachments, your memory, your disappeared friends, your prestige [...] All that is the content of your consciousness. Can you get rid of it right now?"

Krishnamurti also summarized his teachings as stating that truth cannot be reached through organised religion or techniques, but through relationship, self-understanding and self-observation. The mental representations (images) man has built shield him from fear, but also disturb his perception. Freedom is freedom from these conceptions, and is contained in pure observation, in "choiceless awareness of our daily existence and activity." He dismissed the need for contrived meditation techniques, instead emphasizing the practice of choiceless awareness as the essence of "true meditation". (Note: The foundation for true meditation is that passive awareness which is the total freedom from authority and ambition, envy and fear. Meditation has no meaning, no significance whatsoever without this freedom [...] Thought is of knowledge and knowledge cannot free the mind of the fact. Meditation is the choiceless awareness of this complex, which empties the mind of the known.)

In his meetings with Nehru in 1947, Krishnamurti elaborated at length on the teachings, saying in one instance:

"Understanding of the self only arises in relationship, in watching yourself in relationship to people, ideas, and things; to trees, the earth, and the world around you and within you. Relationship is the mirror in which the self is revealed. Without self-knowledge there is no basis for right thought and action."

Nehru asked, "How does one start?" to which Krishnamurti replied:

"Begin where you are. Read every word, every phrase, every paragraph of the mind, as it operates through thought."

In his book Beyond Violence, Krishnamurti stated, "Observe the self in operation, learn about it, watch it, be aware of it. Do not try to destroy it, get rid of it or change it – just watch it, without any choice or distortion. Out of that watching and learning, the self disappears."

=== Influence – 'nobody understood' ===
Krishnamurti in 1984

While his personal charisma affected many, both Krishnamurti himself and many commentators have noted that his teachings do not seem to have changed any person. At his deathbed, to assiciates, he stated:

"[p]erhaps they will somewhat [get into touch with that energy] if they live the teachings. But nobody has done it. Nobody. And so that's that."

He also stated:

"if you all knew what you have missed – that vast emptiness."

Krishnamurti tried to convey his experience of "the otherness" to others, but without a "method", as this would be another "thought-control method." In 1935, Rom Landau asked him, "How do you expect to help others?" adding "You forget that we all, millions and millions of us, live in the vast plains at the foot of the mountain." To this, Krishnamurti answered:

How can you expect me to be concerned with what should be done or how it should be done? If you have once lived on a mountain top, you cannot return to the plains. You can only try to make other people feel the purity of the air and enjoy the infinite prospect, and become one with the beauty of life there.

Emily Lutyens once wrote to him:

"You seem surprised that people do not understand you but I should be far more surprised if they did! After all, you are upsetting everything in which they have ever believed – knocking out their foundations and putting in its place a nebulous abstraction."

Mary Lutyens noted a quite utilitarian motive in Krishnamurti's audiences, stating that

"the possibility he holds out of an almost instantaneous psychological transformation in each one of us which will end sorrow and solve all our problems is so irresistible"

that people kept coming to his talks, a motive quite different from Krishnamurti's aim of radical righteousness.

Nevertheless, interest in Krishnamurti and his work was not consistent through his lifetime and has persisted in the years since his death. Many books, audio, video, and computer materials, remain in print and are carried by major online and traditional retailers. The official Foundations continue to maintain archives, disseminate the teachings in an increasing number of languages, convert print to digital and other media, develop websites and video and social media channels, sponsor television programs, and organise meetings and dialogues of interested persons around the world. There are also several Krishnamurti retreat centres in the UK, USA and India.

== Notable admirers and meetings ==
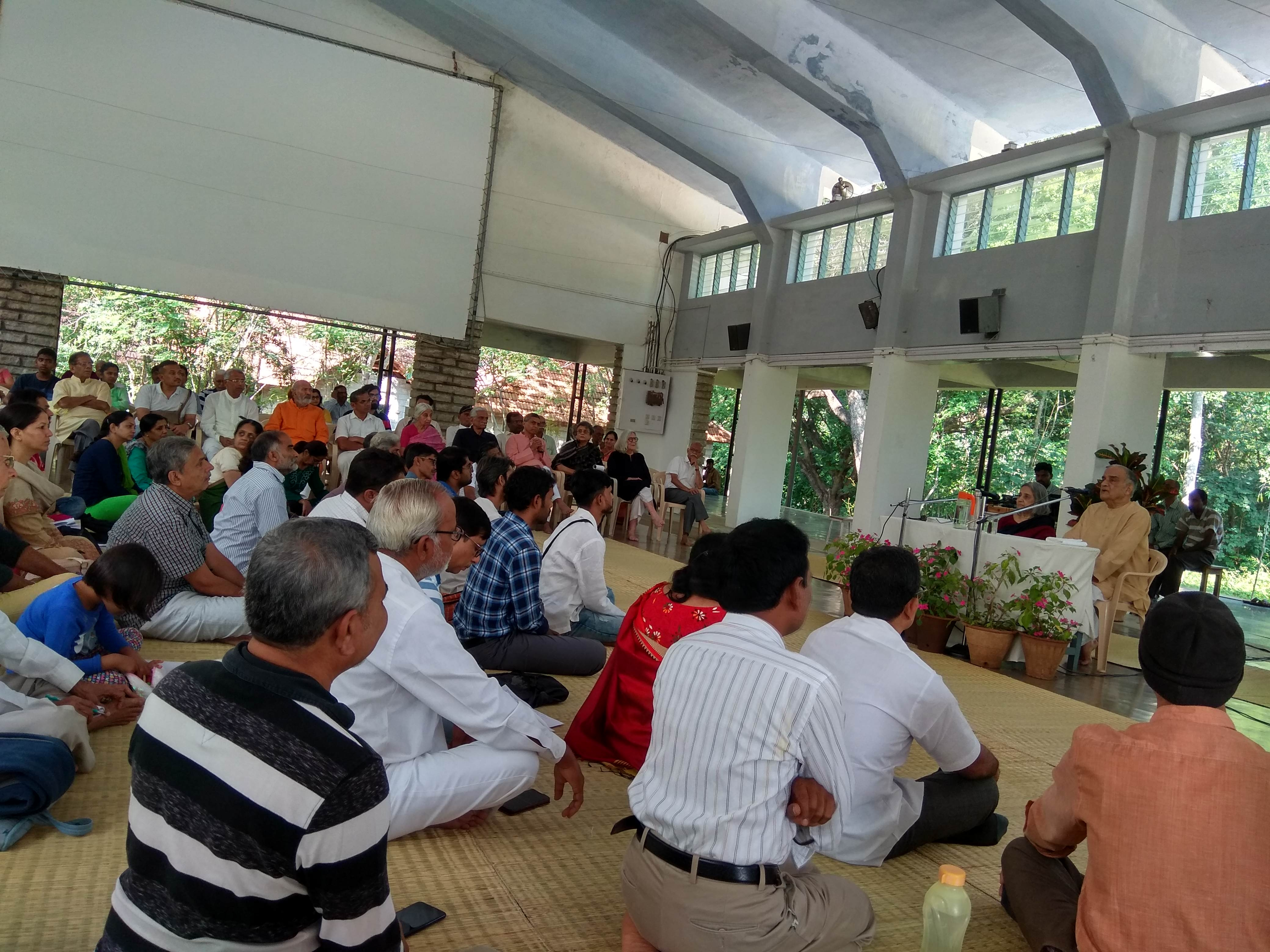
KFI retreat session at Rishi Valley on 17 November 2019, Padmanabhan Krishna addressing the gathering, with Radhika Herzberger presiding

Notable individuals influenced by Krishnamurti include George Bernard Shaw, David Bohm, Jawaharlal Nehru, the Dalai Lama, Aldous Huxley, Alan Watts, Henry Miller, Bruce Lee, Terence Stamp, Jackson Pollock, Toni Packer, Achyut Patwardhan, Dada Dharmadhikari, Derek Trucks, U.G. Krishnamurti and Eckhart Tolle.

George Bernard Shaw in his later years was acquainted with Krishnamurti and declared Krishnamurti to be the "most beautiful human being" he had ever met. In 1938 Krishnamurti met Aldous Huxley. The two began a close friendship which endured for many years.

When Krishnamurti was in India in 1947, many prominent personalities came to meet him, including Prime Minister Jawaharlal Nehru. In the 1970s, Krishnamurti met several times with then Indian prime minister Indira Gandhi, with whom he had far-ranging, and in some cases, very serious conversations. Jayakar considers his message in meetings with Indira Gandhi as a possible influence in the lifting of certain emergency measures Gandhi had imposed during periods of political turmoil.

Krishnamurti was very highly regarded by several leading religious figures in India. Nisargadatta Maharaj described Krishnamurti as 'complete Brahman'. Anandamayi Ma addressed him as the 'Guru of gurus'. When Ramana Maharshi was asked why Krishnamurti dissolved the Order of the Star in the East, he replied "The Order's purpose stood consummated in that the World Teacher had arrived; that is why it was dissolved." He engaged in discussions with several well known Hindu and Buddhist scholars and leaders, including the Dalai Lama. (Note: The Dalai Lama characterised Krishnamurti as a "great soul" (Jayakar 1986, p. 203). Krishnamurti very much enjoyed the Lama's company and by his own admission could not bring up his anti-guru views, mindful of the Lama's feelings.) Several of these discussions were later published as chapters in various Krishnamurti books.

In his later years, he met with prominent religious leaders and scholars including Swami Venkatesananda, Anandamayi Ma, Lakshman Joo, Walpola Rahula, and Eugene Schalert. In India he also met with many sanyasis and monks throughout his life.

Although Krishnamurti's philosophy delved into fields as diverse as religious studies, education, psychology, physics, and consciousness studies, he was not then, nor since, well known in academic circles. Nevertheless, Krishnamurti met and held discussions with physicists Fritjof Capra and E. C. George Sudarshan, biologist Rupert Sheldrake, psychiatrist David Shainberg, as well as psychotherapists representing various theoretical orientations.

In 1974 Krishnamurti was interviewed on PBS television in a series of 18 dialogues with Alan W. Anderson. The dialogues resulted in two books being published.

== See also ==
- Mazu polishing a tile

== Sources ==
- Aberbach, David (1993). "Mystical union and grief: The Ba'al Shem Tov and Krishnamurti". Harvard Theological Review. 86 (3): 309–321. doi:10.1017/s0017816000031254. ISSN 0017-8160. JSTOR 1510013. S2CID 162399497.(subscription required)
- Bhatt, Mahesh (1992). U.G. Krishnamurti: A life. Viking. Archived from the original on 5 August 2025 – via ug-k.blogspot.com.
- Fausset, Hugh l'Anson (14 May 1954). "Bond and Free". The Times Literary Supplement (book review). London, UK. p. 317. ISSN 0040-7895. Gale EX1200099611.
- Jayakar, Pupul (1986). Krishnamurti: A biography (1st ed.). San Francisco, CA: Harper & Row. ISBN 978-0-06-250401-2.
- Jayakar, Pupu (2000). J. Krishnamurti: A biography. London, UK: Penguin UK. ISBN 978-93-5118-284-9.
- Krishnamurti, Jiddu (1926). "Editorial notes". The Herald of the Star. Vol. XV, no. 1. London, UK: Theosophical Publishing House. p. 3. OCLC 225662044.
- Krishnamurti, Jiddu (1928a). "Who brings the truth?". The Pool of Wisdom: Who brings the truth, by what authority, and three poems. Eerde, Ommen: Star Publishing Trust. pp. 43–53. OCLC 4894479. Archived from the original on 19 December 2010 – via jiddu-krishnamurti.net [web publisher] (Saaremaa, Estonia).
- Krishnamurti, Jiddu (1929). "The dissolution of the Order of the Star: A statement by J. Krishnamurti". International Star Bulletin. [issues renumbered starting August 1929]. Vol. 3, no. 2. Eerde, Ommen: Star Publishing Trust. pp. 28–34. OCLC 34693176. Archived from the original on 15 August 2015 – via J.Krishnamurti Online (jkrishnamurti.org) [web publisher].
- Krishnamurti, Jiddu (1960). Public talk 4, Madras, 23 December 1956 (official transcript). Talks by Krishnamurti in India 1956–1957. Ojai, California: Krishnamurti Writings. OCLC 33232421 – via J. Krishnamurti Online.
- Krishnamurti, Jiddu (1963). Public Talk 5, London, England, 14 June 1962 (official transcript). Talks by Krishnamurti in Europe 1962. Ojai, California: Krishnamurti Writings. OCLC 24765752. Archived from the original on 24 January 2023 – via J. Krishnamurti Online.
- Krishnamurti, Jiddu (1972). "Eerde gathering, 1927: Questions and answers". Early Writings of J. Krishnamurti. Vol. II [Offprints from Chetana 1970]. Bombay, IN: Chetana. pp. 6–14. OCLC 312923125. Archived from the original on 19 December 2010 – via jiddu-krishnamurti.net [web publisher] (Saaremaa, Estonia).
- Krishnamurti, Jiddu (2004) [1982]. Krishnamurti's Journal. Bramdean, UK: Krishnamurti Foundation Trust. ISBN 978-0-900506-23-9.—Originally published (1982) San Francisco, CA: Harper & Row
- Landau, Rom (1939). God is my Adventyre: A book on modern mystics, masters, and teachers. London, UK: Gaber and Faber – via Internet Archive (archive.org).
- Lutyens, Mary (1975). Krishnamurti: The years of awakening (1st U.S. ed.). New York, NY: Farrar, Straus and Giroux. ISBN 978-0-374-18222-9.
- Lutyens, Mary (1983). Krishnamurti: The years of awakening (1st Avon Discus ed.). New York, NY: Avon Discus Printing. ISBN 0-380-00734-7 – via Internet Archive (archive.org).
- Lutyens, Mary (1983b). Krishnamurti: The years of fulfilment (1st U.S. hdbk ed.). New York, NY: Farrar, Straus and Giroux. ISBN 978-0-374-18224-3 – via Internet Archive (archive.org).
- Lutyens, Mary (1988). The Open Door (1st U.S. ed.). Farrar, Straus and Giroux. ISBN 978-0-7195-4534-4 – via Internet Archive (archive.org).
- Lutyens, Mary (1990). The life and death of Krishnamurti (1st U.K. ed.). London, UK: John Murray. ISBN 978-0-7195-4749-2.
- Lutyens, Mary (1995). The Boy Krishna: The first fourteen years in the life of J. Krishnamurti (pamphlet). Bramdean, UK: Krishnamurti Foundation Trust. ISBN 978-0-900506-13-0.
- Lutyens, Mary (1997). Krishnamurti: The years of awakening. Shambhala. ISBN 978-1-57062-288-5 – via Google.
- Lutyens, Mary (2003). The life and death of Krishnamurti (pamphlet). Bramdean, UK: Krishnamurti Foundation Trust. ISBN 0-900506-22-9.
- Lutyens, Mary (2003a). The Open Door. Bramdean, UK: Krishnamurti Foundation Trust. ISBN 978-0-900506-21-5 – via Google.
- Padmanabhan, Krishna (2015). A Jewel on a Silver Platter: Remembering Jiddu Krishnamurti. Varanasi: Pilgrims Publishing. ISBN 978-93-5076-056-7.
- Sloss, Radha Rajagopal (1991a). Lives in the Shadow with J. Krishnamurti (1st ed.). London, UK: Bloomsbury Publishing. ISBN 978-0-7475-0720-8.
- Sloss, Radha Rajagopal (1993) [1991]. Lives in the Shadow with J. Krishnamurti (reprint 1st ed.). London, UK: Bloomsbury Publishing. ISBN 978-0-2016-3211-8.
- Sloss, Radha Rajagopal (2011) [1991]. Lives in the shadow with J. Krishnamurti (e-book ed.). Lincoln, NE: iUniverse. ISBN 978-14-6203131-3.
- "Jiddu Krishnamurti, philosophical and religious teacher". The Times (obituary). London, UK. 19 February 1986. p. 14. ISSN 0140-0460. Gale A117898889.
- Vas, Luis S.R. (2004). J. Krishnamurti: Great liberator or failed messiah?. Motilall Banarsidass.
- Vernon, Roland (2001). Star in the East: Krishnamurti: The invention of a messiah. New York, NY: Palgrave. ISBN 978-0-312-23825-4 – via Internet Archive (archive.org).
- Weeraperuma, Susunaga (1974). A Bibliography of the Life and Teachings of Jiddu Krishnamurti (1st hardcover ed.). Leiden: E. J. Brill. ISBN 978-90-04-04007-6 – via Google.
- Weeraperuma, Susunaga (1998) [1982]. Jiddu Krishnamurti: A bibliographical guide (hdcv reprint 2nd rev. ed.). Delhi, IN: Motilal Banarsidass. ISBN 978-81-208-1426-4 – via Google.—originally published 1982 as Supplement to a bibliography of the life and teachings of Jiddu Krishnamurti. Bombay
- Weeraperuma, Susunaga (1998a) [1988]. Krishnamurti as I Knew Him. Delhi, IN: Motilall Banarsidass – via Internet Archive (archive.org).
- Williams, Christine V. (2004). Jiddu Krishnamurti: World philosopher (1895–1986): His life and thoughts (1st hdcv ed.). Delhi, IN: Motilal Banarsidass. ISBN 978-81-208-2032-6 – via Google.
- Zimbalist, Mary (2014). Forbes, Scott H. (ed.). "In the presence of Krishnamurti: The memoirs of Mary Zimbalist". In the presence of Krishnamurti (inthepresenceofk.org). Portland, Oregon: Holistic Education. Archived from the original on 3 March 2022.—Originally published in series, March 2013 – December 2014
