= Polar Star (Decembrist journal) =

Russian language literary almanac

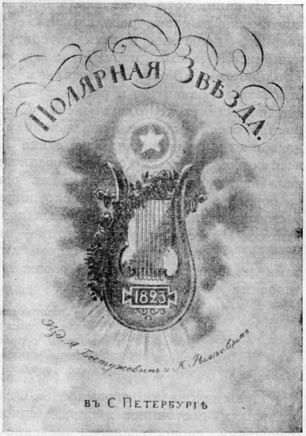
- Polar Star title page, 1823
- Editor: Kondraty Ryleyev; Alexander Bestuzhev
- Frequency: Yearly
- Founded: 1822
- Final issue: 1825
- Based in: Saint Petersburg
- Language: Russian

Polar Star was a Russian language literary almanac, published in Saint Petersburg from 1822 to 1825. The full title in Russian was Полярная звезда. Карманная книжка для любительниц и любителей русской словесности (Polar star. A pocket book for lovers of Russian literature). The main editors were Alexander Bestuzhev and Kondraty Ryleyev. Many prominent Russian poets contributed to the Polar Star, including Alexander Pushkin and Vasily Zhukovsky.
