= Order of the Polar Star (Norway) =

Norwegian order of chivalry

For the Order of the Polar Star in Sweden, see Order of the Polar Star.

The Order of the Polar Star (Norwegian: Polarstjerneordenen; abbreviated PSO), established in 1894, is a private order in Norway. It is granted to persons who with significance have contributed to the development or the protection of Norwegian art and cultural heritage.

The Order of the Polar Star was established by Mikkel Dobloug on 18 October 1894, his 50th birthday. In 1997 the Order was revitalised by Dobloug's great-great-grandson Christian Mikkel Dobloug.

Bjørnstjerne Bjørnson was among the first receivers of the Order. Among recent years' receivers are prominent persons in Norway, among others Carl Nicolaus of Wedel Jarlsberg and Stein Erik Hagen.

== List of receivers ==
Year	Name	Occupation	Reference
1894	Dobloug, Jens		
1894	Dobloug, Mikkel		
1894	Schou, Halvor		
1895	Bjørnson, Bjørnstjerne		
1896	Krogh, Kristian		
1899	Thommesen, Olaf Anton		
1900	Sinding, Christian August		
1900?	Mikkelsen, Christian		
1910	Nærup, Carl Georg Nicolay Hansen		
1910	Kjær, Nils		
1919	Ingar, Dobloug		
1919	Dobloug, Ingar		
1999	Dobloug d.y., Ingar		
1999	Eikeland, Kåre Norwald		
2001	Sulheim, Christian	tourist host	
2001	Schou, Christian Julius	architect	
2001	Fjeldstad, Lise	actress	
2002	Brimi, Arne	chef	
2002	Ennals, Peter	boat-builder	
2002	Hagen, Stein Erik	merchant	
2003	Hisdal, Solveig	designer	
2004	Berg, Kirsten Bråten	artist	
2004	Harr, Karl Erik	artist	
2008	Fagermo, Terje	artist	
2008	Gjørv, Inger Lise	governor	
2012	Carl Nicolaus Wedel Jarlsberg	estate owner	
