= List of works about Jiddu Krishnamurti =

Jiddu Krishnamurti or J. Krishnamurti (12 May 1895 – 17 February 1986) was a writer and speaker on philosophical and spiritual issues. His subject matter included psychological revolution, the nature of the mind, meditation, human relationships, and bringing about positive social change. Works about his life and his philosophy first appeared in the early-20th-century; as of 2011 related works have continued appearing in several subject areas, and in a variety of formats and media.Some of his works are used in Universities around the world.

== About the works ==
=== Subject biography ===
Jiddu Krishnamurti was born 1895 in the town of Madanapalle in then-colonial India, to a family of middle class Telugu Brahmins. His father was associated with the Theosophical Society, and in the early part of the 20th century young Krishnamurti came to be promoted by the leadership of the Society as the so-called World Teacher, a new messiah. In 1929 he disavowed this role and dissolved the worldwide organization (the Order of the Star) formed to support it. He severed his ties to Theosophy and the Theosophical Society, and declared independence from all religious, philosophical, and cultural disciplines and practices.

He spent the rest of his life presenting a uniquely expressed philosophy of life around the world, asserting that only unflinching self-inquiry can lead to genuine discovery and to resolution of all personal and social conflict. Until his death in 1986 he was constantly stressing the need for a revolution in the psyche of every human being, while positing that such revolution cannot be brought about by any external entity, be it religious, political, or social.

=== Timeline and availability ===
Works and news items about Krishnamurti started appearing in the beginning of the 20th century, shortly after his "discovery" as a possible new Messiah. The extraordinary circumstances surrounding young Krishnamurti, and the related proclamations of Theosophical leaders, resulted in intense scrutiny and publicity throughout his "messianic" period. Interest was renewed and amplified by his later repudiation of the so-called World Teacher Project and of Theosophy. During his middle years publicity and interest lessened, but did not disappear; by the late 1960s he was firmly reestablished in the public stage, with a corresponding increase in the number of works and news items about him.

Since his death in 1986 books, monographs, research papers in various disciplines, news items etc., in print and other media, have continued to appear, examining various aspects of Krishnamurti and his message. (Note: Krishnamurti and his philosophy have generated occasional debates in academic journals: Jean L. Mercier and Murari M. Agrawal in the International Philosophical Quarterly (1988–89); John Wren-Lewis and Madan Gopal in the Journal of Humanistic Psychology (1994–96). From InfoTrac and EBSCOhost respectively (subscription required) [infotrac & ebsco]. Separately from the instances where he or his philosophy were the main subjects, Krishnamurti or his works have been peripherally cited since the mid-20th-century in a wide variety of such journals. An indicative list: Philosophy (October 1949); Journal of Religion and Health (Spring 2006); Journal of Science Education and Technology (June 2003); Daedalus (Fall 1989); Journal of Modern Literature (Summer 1990); Art Journal (Autumn 1998); Economic and Political Weekly (29 September–5 October 2001); The Journal of Military History (July 1999); Studies in East European Thought (September 1996); Rocky Mountain Review of Language and Literature (Autumn 1975); Dance Chronicle (September 2009). From journals archived at JSTOR and EBSCOhost. (subscription required) [jstor & ebsco].)

Krishnamurti has additionally been the subject of, or a claimed source of inspiration in, the works of artists in diverse fields (see section Artistic depictions below). They have included playwrights (Note: Blue Dove Online 2004. Promotional/information website for Blue Dove, a musical that premiered 2004 at Los Angeles' Ivar Theatre and had a 3-week stage run. The libretto, (by Englishman Peter Wells) is loosely based on Krishnamurti's life during the time between his "discovery" by Charles Webster Leadbeater and the start of his career as an independent speaker and teacher following the dissolution of the Order of the Star, roughly covering the same time-period as Mary Lutyens' Krishnamurti: The Years of Awakening, listed here.) and actors, (Note: Schiffman 2007. Article in Back Stage West magazine. "The article presents the views of several actors and actresses about spiritual commitment. Los Angeles theatre artist Kim Terrell said that she has come to integrate the teachings of Indian spiritual writer Jiddu Krishnamurti and Stanislavsky on the importance of awareness." [Abstract (excerpted) from article entry at EBSCOhost. (subscription required)].) musicians, novelists, and at least one choreographer. (Note: Looseleaf 2009. Article in The Los Angeles Times about collaborative, modern dance and puppet theater work choreographed by Joe Goode, which "incorporates bits of text from ... philosopher Jiddu Krishnamurti".)

As of 31 December 2010, according to one source, Krishnamurti-related materials numbered "2,412 works in 4,580 publications in 53 languages and 46,822 library holdings". (Note: A search conducted 31 December 2010 at WorldCat for subject "Krishnamurti, Jiddu" returned over 900 results ["Search for Library items". Since the 1910s and as of 2011 he has been referenced in works or classified either by his given name (Krishnamurti) or by his family name (Jiddu, or in some cases variations such as Jeddu, usually pre-1933); in general, he was often referred to by the given name only].)

== Listing of works ==
=== List guidelines and format ===
1. With the exception of the section Mass media items, entries for each class type and publishing medium have been listed alphabetically by primary author or creator, and then (in ascending order) by the original publication or release date. In the absence of this date, the earliest dated edition is used. If no other date is available, the date of work is listed when feasible.
2. The expression "JKO [text]" when used in citations represents the document or webpage serial number or id at Jiddu Krishnamurti Online (JKO).
3. Additional editions or imprints (incl. other media formats) of cited works are listed consecutively in ascending date order, separated by double semicolons (;;). Information common to all listed editions appears in the first listing only.
4. List is not meant to be exhaustive and should not be considered a complete representation of works about Jiddu Krishnamurti.

Format: Last, First (date [per point 1 above]). Title [in italics or "quotation marks"].<reference>[comments].<further references as needed [appearing under Notes and sources]>

=== Principal biographies ===
Print

The following people were authorized by Krishnamurti to write his biography.

- Lutyens, Mary (1975). Krishnamurti: The Years of Awakening. Also an official biographer, Mary Lutyens was a lifelong confidante of Krishnamurti whom she first met 1911, while she was still a toddler. This first volume of a three-volume biography of Krishnamurti covers years from birth in 1895 to year-end 1933.
- Lutyens, Mary (1983). Krishnamurti: The Years of Fulfilment. Second volume of her biography covers years 1933 to 1980. (Note: McGhee 2000, p. 1039. "Although there are other volumes [in Lutyens' biography], this one is the most focused on the years Krishnamurti's basic ideas and teachings were formulated.")
- Jayakar, Pupul (1986). J. Krishnamurti: A Biography. Pupul Jayakar met Krishnamurti in 1948 and remained a friend and associate until his death. (Note: Jayakar 1986, p. xi [in "Preface"]; M. Lutyens 1975a, p. ix [in "Foreword"].) (Note: White 2005, p. 5246. White thinks that this biography, and generally, "much else written about Krishnamurti ... contains little analytical apparatus to help the reader understand its subject." However he quotes from the biography, and lists it in his sources.)
- Lutyens, Mary (1988). Krishnamurti: The Open Door. Final volume of biography covers years 1980 to 1986, the end of Krishnamurti's life.
- Lutyens, Mary (1996). Krishnamurti and the Rajagopals. Biographical and personal reply to the controversial book written by Radha Rajagopal-Sloss: Lives in The Shadow with J. Krishnamurti, which (on the author's words) allegedly contains: "misstatements of fact, false inferences and snide innuendoes, and it is heavily biased in an attempt to justify the author's parents at Krishnamurti's expense".
- Lutyens, Mary (2005). J. Krishnamurti: A Life. This book is a compilation of The Years of Awakening, The Years of Fulfilment, and The Open Door.
- Zimbalist, Mary; Forbes, Scott H. (2013). In the Presence of Krishnamurti: The Memoirs of Mary Zimbalist. The edited transcription of 94 audio recorded discussions that occurred over 14 years in which Mary Zimbalist reads out and discusses with Scott H. Forbes her daily dairies of 22 years of being with Krishnamurti.
- Zimbalist, Mary (2018). In the Presence of Krishnamurti: Mary's Unfinished Book. Krishnamurti only asked two people to write about him: Mary Lutyens and Mary Zimbalist. He wanted Mary Lutyens to record the whole of his life, and he wanted Mary Zimbalist to write about what it was like to be with him, which she does using, as her source material, the daily dairies she kept for the 22 years she was with him. This work can also be found online after her initial but unfinished attempt to write a book, about what it was like to be with Krishnamurti. From this work, we know more about the daily life of Krishnamurti than any other famous person alive.

=== Other biographies ===
A number of biographical works have been published. (Note: An early Theosophical work was The Lives of Alcyone (Besant & Leadbeater 2003). Originally published 1924 in two volumes, this was presented as an occult biography of Krishnamurti's reputed past lives. Alcyone was the pseudonym assigned to Krishnamurti in 1910 by his then mentor, influential Theosophist Charles Webster Leadbeater, who had determined Krishnamurti was likely to be the "vehicle" for the so-called Maitreya or World Teacher, a messianic entity. This book by Leadbeater and Besant, then President of the Theosophical Society, describes forty-eight purported reincarnations of Krishnamurti. Alcyone's reported birth-years for these lives ranged from around 70,000 BC to 624 AD (Besant & Leadbeater 2003a, "[Table:] Forty-Eight Lives of Alcyone", p. 16); M. Lutyens 1975a, pp. 23–24. Krishnamurti's past lives were reputedly recorded via clairvoyant investigations by Leadbeater, who was highly respected for his occult knowledge and abilities by Theosophists. The record of "extraordinary" past lives was offered in support of the authors' claims regarding Krishnamurti's likely messianic status. Most of the material in The Lives of Alcyone was reprinted from an earlier work, 1913's Man: How, Whence, and Whither; a record of clairvoyant investigation (OCLC 871602), also by Besant and Leadbeater, and had been additionally published in serial form in Theosophical journals. The majority of contemporary Theosophists believed the material regarding "Alcyone's lives" to be genuine and important. However it also added to (or started) disputes within Theosophical circles, and has for various reasons been considered controversial inside and outside Theosophy. Among the more obvious reasons: the work's doctrinal nature, and Krishnamurti's later, strongly negative stance towards such matters. (There is no indication that Krishnamurti was involved or cooperated in any way in the production of works about Alcyone's "lives"). Other reasons for the work's controversial nature involve often elaborate interpretations and criticisms of its occult or esoteric provenance or accuracy, by a variety of warring commentators. In the 1960s some Theosophists advanced the view that the findings of Leadbeater's related clairvoyant investigations were the result of "self-projection" (Wood 1964); like other Krishnamurti-related issues, "the lives of Alcyone" have continued, as of 2011 to occasionally be the subject of discussion among theosophists and researchers of Theosophy (Alpheus 2001).) Many are by people who knew Krishnamurti at some point in his life, or had been associates of his for various lengths of time. (Note: M. Lutyens 2003a, p. 216. Speaking at a meeting of the trustees of the Krishnamurti Foundations in 1976, Krishnamurti had in effect asked his associates to communicate – especially after his death – the impression that his presence and teachings had had on their lives: "If people come here and ask, 'What was it like to live with this man?' would you be able to convey it to them?"; Chandmal 1985, p. 7; Hay, Peter (1989). "Preface". In Field 1989, pp. ix–xv, especially p. xiv; M. Lutyens 1990, pp. 171, 188. He further encouraged, in the last few decades of his life, close associates and friends to share their experiences of him.) Others are posthumous scholarly or lay works produced with or without the cooperation of people close to him.

Print

- Keshav Ramachandra Chhapkhane . "J. Krushnamurti, Sandesh Ani Parichay". Short Introduction to philosophy of J. Krushnamurthi in Marathi Language ( India – Maharashtra) by author of "Swadhyay Dyaneshwari" ( Author was a Philosopher, Theosophist, Pleader, Freedom fighter from Sangli-Maharashtra state, India born in 1875)
- Balfour-Clarke, Russel (1977). The Boyhood Of J. Krishnamurti. Reminiscences from one of the young Theosophists trusted with the boy Krishnamurti's upbringing.
- Blackburn, Gabriele (1996). The Light Of Krishnamurti. The author had known Krishnamurti since her childhood, and was one of the first students of the Happy Valley School – since renamed Besant Hill School – that was founded by Krishnamurti and associates in Ojai, California. Right education was one of Krishnamurti's major concerns. He established several schools, in India, the United States, and the United Kingdom.
- Blau, Evelyne (1995). Krishnamurti: 100 Years. Collecting reminiscences by people who knew him, and accounts of others (well known and not so well known) influenced by him, this book commemorates the 100th anniversary of Krishnamurti's birth, along with a look at his work and legacy. Evelyne Blau had been a Krishnamurti Foundation trustee since the 1970s.
- Chandmal, Asit (1985). One Thousand Moons: Krishnamurti at Eighty-Five. The author was a close friend and longtime associate of Krishnamurti in India.
- Chandmal, Asit (1995). One Thousand Suns: Krishnamurti at Eighty-Five and the Last Walk. This is an expanded follow up version of One Thousand Moons.
- Field, Sidney (1989). Krishnamurti: The Reluctant Messiah. Peter Hay, editor. The author originally met Krishnamurti in California in the 1920s and they remained friends until Krishnamurti's death.
- Giddu, Narayan (1998). As The River Joins The Ocean. Chandramouli Narsipur, editor. The author, an educator and principal of a Krishnamurti Foundation India-affiliated school, was Krishnamurti's nephew and a longtime associate.
- Grohe, Friedrich (1991). The Beauty of the Mountain. The author originally met Krishnamurti in 1983, and eventually became a trustee of several Krishnamurti Foundations.
- Holroyd, Stuart (1991). Krishnamurti: the man, the mystery, and the message.
- Krohnen, Michael (1996). The Kitchen Chronicles: 1001 Lunches with Krishnamurti. Reminiscences by the chef at Krishnamurti's Ojai, California home.
- Lutyens, Emily (1957). Candles in the Sun. Memoir by Mary Lutyens' mother Emily (née Lady Lytton, 1874–1964), who had a long and very intimate relationship with Krishnamurti.
- Lutyens, Mary (1990). The Life and Death of Krishnamurti An abridgement of her trilogy of Krishnamurti's life listed in Principal biographies above.
  - Lutyens, Mary (1991). Krishnamurti: His Life and Death. Republication of The Life and Death of Krishnamurti with a different title and publisher.
- Lutyens, Mary (1995). The Boy Krishna. Pamphlet, subtitled "The First Fourteen Years in the Life of J. Krishnamurti".
- Lutyens, Mary (1996). Krishnamurti and the Rajagopals. The author's "personal reply" to Radha Rajagopal Sloss's book Lives in the Shadow with J. Krishnamurti (listed below), it contains detailed refutations of statements and allegations contained in that book.
- Patwardhan, Sunanda (1999). A Vision of the Sacred. The author had been a longtime friend of Krishnamurti and had worked as his private secretary in India.
- Ross, Joseph E. (2000). Krishnamurti: The Taormina seclusion 1912. Focuses on the young Krishnamurti's correspondence with various parties during a retreat to Taormina, Italy, in 1912.
- Sloss, Radha Rajagopal (1991). Lives in the Shadow with J. Krishnamurti. A critical look at the private life of Krishnamurti by the daughter of erstwhile close associates Rajagopal Desikacharya (D. Rajagopal) and Rosalind Rajagopal.
- Smith, Ingram (1989). Truth Is A Pathless Land: A Journey with Krishnamurti. The author had been a longtime associate of Krishnamurti in Australia.
- Smith, Ingram (1999). The Transparent Mind: A Journey with Krishnamurti. This is an expanded follow up version of A Journey with Krishnamurti, above.
- Vernon, Roland (2001). Star In The East: The Invention of a Messiah.
- Weeraperuma, Susunaga (1989). Krishnamurti as I Knew Him.
- Weeraperuma, Susunaga (2016). Remembering Krishnamurti: Personal Anecdotes About the World Teacher.
- Williams, Christine V. (2004). Jiddu Krishnamurti: World Philosopher. Based on a doctoral thesis submitted to the University of Technology, Sydney. Williams stated in a related conference paper, "The thesis for my biography was that the life of J. Krishnamurti could be read in the context of a stream of philosophy, Advaita Vedanta, based on the ancient sacred texts, the Vedas".
- Patnaik, Shuvendu (2015). "The Story of Krishnamurti – A Critical Perspective of His Life and Teachings". This book contains Jiddu Krishnamurti's life story together with his teachings, spiritual science and Theosophy, all in a single book. The book explores the science in spirituality through Krishnamurti's life and teachings, and presents it all in a story-style narrative.
- Forbes, Scott H. (2018) Krishnamurti: Preparing to leave. During the last 9 months of Krishnamurti's life the author spent 6 to 8 hours a day with Krishnamurti, up until the moment of his death, and kept detailed notes.
- Kishore, Mahesh (2019) Nitya – A Tale of Two Brothers
- Padmanabhan, Krishna (2015). A Jewel on a Silver Platter: Remembering Jiddu Krishnamurti. Varanasi: Pilgrims Publishing. ISBN 978-93-5076-056-7.
- Balasundaram, S. (2012). Non-Guru Guru: My Years with J. Krishnamurti. Ojai, California: Edwin House Publishing, Inc. ISBN 978-0-9760006-3-1.

Video

- Krishnamurti Foundation of America (1995). The Future of Krishnamurti's Teachings. Short video produced by the Krishnamurti Foundation of America on the 100th anniversary of his birth. An introduction to Krishnamurti and his message.
- Lucas, George et al. (2007). "Jiddu Krishnamurti: The Reluctant Messiah". Lucasfilm-produced historical documentary, included in the DVD adaptation of the TV series The Young Indiana Jones Chronicles, listed below. Part of the Special Features in "Volume I: The Early Years Disk 7: The Journey of Radiance" DVD. (Note: The Young Indiana Jones Chronicles § DVD.)
- Mendizza, Michael (1990). Krishnamurti: With A Silent Mind. One of several informational, quasi-biographical documentary films about J. Krishnamurti directed by Mendizza and produced by the Krishnamurti Foundation of America.

=== Other representations ===
Among the following works are interpretations, studies, or comparative analyses of his life and message. Krishnamurti did not accept any interpreters, contemporary or future; instead, he advocated the unmediated examination of his work. (Note: J. Krishnamurti 1970b. Statement regarding interpretations of Krishnamurti's message, was published in the official bulletins of all Krishnamurti Foundations [Jiddu Krishnamurti § External links]: "From the nineteen twenties I have been saying that there should be no interpreters of the teachings for they distort the teachings and it becomes a means of exploitation. No interpreters are necessary, for each person should observe directly his own activities, not according to any theory or authority. Unfortunately interpreters have sprung up, a fact for which we are in no way responsible. In recent years several people have asserted they are my successors and that they have been specially chosen by me to disseminate the teachings. I have said, and I again repeat, that there are no representatives of Krishnamurti personally or of his teachings during or after his lifetime. I am very sorry that this has to be said again." (M. Lutyens 1983b, pp. 170–171).)

Print

- Agrawal, Murari M. (2002). "Krishnamurti I" and "Krishnamurti II". Two sections in Chapter 7 of the book Freedom of the soul: a post-modern understanding of Hinduism, by the same author. An attempt to portray Krishnamurti's philosophy as being within the boundaries of some contemporary interpretations of Hinduism.
- Boutte, Veronica (2002). The phenomenology of compassion in the teachings of Jiddu Krishnamurti. An examination through the lens of Phenomenological Psychology. Part of a series of books on "Asian thought and religion".
- De La Cruz, Francis James C. (2005). "A Philosophy for Holistic Education". Following the views of J. Krishnamurti, this scholarly journal article presents a philosophy of holistic education based on the idea of school as a "community of learners."
- Dhopeshwarkar, Atmaram D. (1967). J. Krishnamurti and awareness in action. One of several books on Krishnamurti and his message by this author, a retired professor of philosophy.
- Eck, Diana L. (1968). "J. Krishnamurti: The Pathless Way". Compilation of the Forum for Correspondence and Contact.
- Erricker, Clive (2001). "Jiddu Krishnamurti and the open secret". Included in the book Contemporary spiritualities: social and religious contexts, edited by Clive and Jane Erricker.
- Fauché, Fabienne (2001). J.-P. Sartre et J. Krishnamurti: Deux "Athéismes" pour Une Morale (In French). (J.-P. Sartre and J. Krishnamurti: Two "Atheisms" for One Morality). Published thesis for a doctorate in Philosophy submitted 1998 to the Paris-Sorbonne University. Comparative analysis of elements of the respective philosophies of Jean-Paul Sartre and Jiddu Krishnamurti. (Note: Abstract (excerpted) from WorldCat listing (OCLC 490466804). "This study compares the works of J.-P. Sartre and J. Krishnamurti. ... Sartre chooses restless action and pursues positivity – a source of failure. Krishnamurti ... insists on an attitude based on negation and psychological nonaction ... then, sensitivity to what is awakes an intelligence that is love and leads to right action.")
- Heber, Lilly (1933). Krishnamurti and the world crisis. Part of a series of books on Krishnamurti by the same author.
- Holroyd, Stuart (1980). The Quest of the Quiet Mind: The Philosophy of Krishnamurti.
- Horan, Richard (2011). "Krishnamurti". Chapter in Horan's Seeds, a book describing the author's "cross-country search for the grand old trees that once provided shade and shelter for America's greatest authors." Horan was interested in a pepper tree that featured in Krishnamurti's reputed "life-altering experiences" at Ojai in 1922. (Note: Jiddu Krishnamurti § Life-altering experiences; M. Lutyens 1997, pp. 155–156, 159, 180n. Cite the pepper tree; Nuxoll 2011. "Horan fails to collect seeds from the California pepper tree under which the Indian mystic had his awakening; yet, he effectively describes how Krishnamurti’s teaching showed him a path toward wisdom and compassion.")
- Kelman, Harold (1956). "Life history as therapy: Part II". Subtitled "On being aware". Second part of an article in The American Journal of Psychoanalysis authored by its editor. It includes discussion of Krishnamurti's ideas on awareness and quotes extensively from his then recently published work The First and Last Freedom.
- Kleindienst, William C. (c. 1926). The Great Lie: Krishnamurti, the false Hindu messiah of theosophy. One of two polemics against Krishnamurti that were authored by a conservative Christian clergyman during the World Teacher period.
- Kumar, Samrat Schmiem (2011). "The Inward Revolution: Aurobindo Ghose and Jiddu Krishnamurti". Chapter in The International Handbook of Peace Studies whose editors, (Wolfgang Dietrich and others) are affiliated with the Editorial Team of the UNESCO Chair for Peace Studies, University of Innsbruck. Kumar, a PhD Research fellow at the Department of Culture Studies and Oriental Languages, University of Oslo, juxtaposes Krishnamurti's and Aurobindo Ghose's (Sri Aurobindo) approaches to peace as part of the Handbook's focus on "the etymological meaning, the religious, legal and political use of the word peace." (Note: Publisher's annotation. From the "Summary" section of the work's WorldCat entry (OCLC 690904750).)
- Martin, Raymond (2003). On Krishnamurti. College-level textbook for philosophy students, by the Department Chair of Philosophy at Union College, New York.
- Maxwell, Patrick (1994). "The Enigma of Krishnamurti". Peer reviewed article from the Journal for the Study of Religion. It "attempts to explore the elusive character of Krishnamurti's approach" and includes discussion of seemingly conflicting or contradictory aspects of Krishnamurti and his message. The author perceives similarities between Krishnamurti's approach and "the basic spirit" of Zen Buddhism.
- Methorst, Henri (2003). Krishnamurti: a spiritual revolutionary.
- Needleman, Jacob (1970). "A Note on Krishnamurti". Included in Needleman's book The New Religions.
- Ogletree, Aaron P. (2007). "Peace Profile: Jiddu Krishnamurti". Profile of Krishnamurti in the Peace Review.
- Réhault, Ludowic (1939). Krishnamurti: Man Is His Own Liberator. The author was acquainted with Krishnamurti and offers a background of the events leading up to his break with Theosophy, and of its aftermath. He also attempts an analysis and explanation of his message. (Note: Réhault 2006, pp. 9, 10. "[Krishnamurti's teachings] have been systematically distorted and wrongly interpreted not only by his enemies, but also by some who profess to be his friends. He himself said publicly to the latter: 'You have come here to pervert what I have to say.'" The author was a member of the Theosophical Society "whose tendencies", he stated, "[he] was far from approving". He was in general agreement with Krishnamurti's new direction, and opposed to leading Theosophists' related criticism.)
- Rodrigues, Hillary (1990). Insight and religious mind. In "American University Studies – Series VII: Theology and Religion".
- Samuels, Henry C. (1929). Krishnamurti the Jew. Subtitled, "A presentation from the Jewish point of view". Pamphlet compiled by Samuels has short pieces and poems (including reprints of Krishnamurti's own work), and an "editorial review" of Krishnamurti's The Pool of Wisdom, originally published 1927. (Note: Samuels 1929, "Foreword" p. 3. (Dated 24 March 1929). "What is it that is so singular about Mr. Krishnamurti? .... The contents of the following pages are heartily offered as a help." The included review of The Pool of Wisdom (1927, Eerde, Ommen: Star Publishing Trust, OCLC 250095568) authored by N.E.B. Ezra.)
- Sanat, Aryel (1999). The inner life of Krishnamurti. A book-length Theosophical examination of Krishnamurti. It attempts to reconcile elements of Esoteric Theosophical doctrine with certain aspects of his life that have not as of 2010 been explained in a conclusive manner: the process (an unusual, lifelong condition), and his reputed inner mystical experiences. (Note: Jiddu Krishnamurti § Life-altering experiences. Includes short description and numerous references and footnotes, including interpretations of these events by Krishnamurti and others.)
- Schuller, Govert W. (1997). "Krishnamurti and the World Teacher Project". An analysis from a late-20th-century theosophical perspective. Originally published in the independent Theosophical History journal as one of its "Occasional Papers".
- Suares, Carlo (1953). Krishnamurti and the Unity of Man. Suares originally met Krishnamurti in the 1940s; they maintained a four-decade long friendship.
- Thapan, Meenakshi (2006). Life at school: an ethnographic study. Examines the "ideology and working" of the Rishi Valley School, a coeducational residential school founded by Krishnamurti and run by the Krishnamurti Foundation India.
- Thuruthiyil, Scaria (1999). The joy of creative living.
- Vas, Luis S. R. (1971). The Mind of J. Krishnamurti. Compilation of personal essays, comparative studies, analyses, etc. by various authors, as well as a small number of discussions between Krishnamurti and others. Edited by Luis Vas. Includes contributions by authors Henry Miller and Aldous Huxley. Also includes a discussion between Krishnamurti and composer Leopold Stokowski.
- Weeraperuma, Susunaga (1978). Living and Dying from Moment to Moment. An investigation of J. Krishnamurti's Teachings.
- Weeraperuma, Susunaga (1983). That Pathless Land: Essays on the Beauty and Uniqueness of J. Krishnamurti's Teachings.
- Weeraperuma, Susunaga (1984). Bliss of Reality: Essays on J. Krishnamurti's Extraordinary Insights into Life.
- Weeraperuma, Susunaga (1986). Sayings of J. Krishnamurti. A collection of Krishnamurti's significant sayings on 118 different subjects.
- Williams, Christine V. (2004). "J. Krishnamurti: Crossing cultural borders or ignoring their existence?" Paper presented to the 15th Biennial Conference of the Asian Studies Association of Australia. The methodology she followed in writing a biography of Krishnamurti as an attempt to present his life and work in the context of Advaita Vedanta.
- Wit, Adriaan de (1992). "Krishnamurti and Ionesco: Pioneers of the New Age Perception/Consciousness". Article in the peer-reviewed Journal of Evolutionary Psychology. Includes commentary on the ideas of Krishnamurti and absurdist playwright Eugène Ionesco regarding language, its use and meaning. Ionesco referenced Krishnamurti in his first play, The Bald Soprano, which premiered 1950. (Note: Ionesco 1982, p. 41. "Mrs. Smith: Krishnamurti! Krishnamurti! Krishnamurti!")

=== Bibliographies, indices, and other helpers ===
Print

- Krishnamurti Foundations (1997). Unconditionally Free. Informational booklet with Krishnamurti quotes and a chronology that includes a listing of places he spoke at from 1911 to 1986.
- Van der Struijf, Cathy & Van der Struijf, John. The Concise Guide to Krishnamurti: A Study Companion and Index to the Recorded Teachings (1979–1986). Compiled by Cathy and John Van der Struijf, edited by Stephen Smith.
- Weeraperuma, Susunaga (1974). A bibliography of the life and teachings of Jiddu Krishnamurti.
- Weeraperuma, Susunaga (1996). Jiddu Krishnamurti: a bibliographical guide. Revised edition of work originally published as Supplement to A bibliography of the life and teachings of Jiddu Krishnamurti.
- Patnaik, Shuvendu (2015). "The Story of Krishnamurti – A Critical Perspective of His Life and Teachings". This book contains Jiddu Krishnamurti's life story together with his teachings, spiritual science and Theosophy, all in a single book. The book explores the science in spirituality through Krishnamurti's life and teachings, and presents it all in a story-style narrative. http://krishnamurtibook.com/

=== Reference resources ===
Print

- Byers, Paula K. (Senior editor) (1998). "Jiddu Krishnamurti". Entry in the 17-volume Encyclopedia of World Biography, includes section on "Krishnamurti's Philosophy". (Note: [Note this article may contain factual errors as it contradicts primary sources, eyewitness accounts, and historical consensus: Krishnamurti's age when "discovered" is put at 12 instead of 14 years old, while Annie Besant instead of Charles Webster Leadbeater is mentioned as the person who "discovered" him. There are other minor discrepancies regarding early dates. (M. Lutyens 1995)].)
- Knowles, Elizabeth (Editor) (2004). "Jiddu Krishnamurti (d. 1986)". Krishnamurti entry at the Oxford Dictionary of Quotations, 2004 edition. The dictionary carries three quotes attributed to Krishnamurti including a "Truth is a pathless land ..." quotation.
- McGhee, Richard D. (2000). "Jiddu Krishnamurti". Profile of Krishnamurti's philosophy in World Philosophers and Their Works, includes short biographical note, analysis of his message as it appeared in published works, and a comprehensive, multipage review of Krishnamurti's Think on These Things.
- White, Charles J. (2005). "Krishnamurti, Jiddu". Multipage entry in the 15-volume Encyclopedia of Religions, includes a bibliography. (Note: [Note article contains factual errors: it states (p. 5244) the dissolution of the Order of the Star as having happened in 1926 instead of 1929. See Jiddu Krishnamurti bibliography: "The Dissolution of the Order of the Star: A Statement by J. Krishnamurti" (September 1929)].)

=== Mass media items ===
Krishnamurti had been in the public spotlight more or less consistently since his adolescence; items about him appeared in mass media and periodical publications throughout his life with varying frequency depending on his perceived topicality. (Note: Williams 2004, p. 198. C. V. Williams states that Krishnamurti's "dense" subject matter, his unique use of certain terms, and the difficulties of his language, would sometimes prompt journalists to oversimplify his message and "trivialize his image.") After his death, and as of year-end 2010, Krishnamurti's life, message, and perceived influence continued to be the subject of occasional media attention.

The following selections are listed (per media category) by date of issue or release in ascending order, then by author, editor or other creator. If the author etc. is unknown, items are sublisted by publication name or program title.

Broadcast

- Levin, Bernard et al. (20 June 1981). "Jiddu Krishnamurti". British journalist Bernard Levin interviewed Krishnamurti in May 1981 at the Brockwood Park School which was founded in 1969 by Krishnamurti. The resulting 30-minute television program aired on BBC Two (during prime time) in June of the same year; it received mixed critical reviews. (Note: James 1981. "[Levin's] brain is almost in the same shape as Krishnamurti's – bland, moist and cloyingly sweet, like a lichee."; M. Lutyens 2003b, p. 43. "We had high hopes for this [interview and broadcast] but it was not a success."; J. Krishnamurti 1996, "[Chapter:] What is your secret? – Bernard Levin" pp. 190–199. Published transcript of the interview; Krishnamurti Library of Athens 2010. Video of the interview (edited). Uncredited. Not an official release.)

Online

- The Hindu Online (26 January 2008). "Foundation working to popularise J Krishnamurti’s message". News article from the online edition of The Hindu newspaper about contemporary activities and projects of the Krishnamurti Foundation India.

Print

- The New York Times (4 August 1929). "Krishnamurti Ends Order Of The Star; Theosophists' Society Dissolved Because Leader Believes Followers Ignore 'Truth'." Report from the 1929 Star Camp at Ommen, the Netherlands, about Krishnamurti's dissolution of the Order of the Star, an organization established to assist him in his then-expected role as the so-called World Teacher.
- The Los Angeles Times (22 April 1934). "Krishnamurti Has New Goal". Brief report about Krishnamurti's plans after the dissolution of the Order of the Star.
- Wood, Ernest (December 1964). "No Religion Higher Than Truth". Article in The American Theosophist magazine by one of Charles Webster Leadbeater's close associates includes an eyewitness account of Krishnamurti's "discovery" by Leadbeater, and comments on related events and controversies. (Note: [Note weblink in reference is not at official Theosophical Society in America website. Link-specific content verified against original at New York Public Library Main Branch ("YBEA (American theosophist)" (call no.). Classic Catalog. New York Public Library.)].)
- Ingram, Catherine & Jacobs, Leonard (July 1983). "I Don't Believe in Anything". Long and far-ranging interview of Krishnamurti in the East West Journal, with foreword by Leonard Jacobs, publisher.
  - Stephan, Karin (July 1983). "The Man Who Would Not Play God". Biographical sketch of Krishnamurti from the East West Journal, ancillary to his interview appearing in the same issue.
- Weatherby, William J. (19 February 1986). "Wise traveller in a pathless land". Obituary, in the London newspaper The Guardian.
- Gillman, Ken (August–October 1998). "Jiddu Krishnamurti". Extensive article from the editor of the astrological quarterly Considerations. Reproduces Krishnamurti's natal chart originally cast shortly after his birth by a well-known Vedic astrologer, (Note: M. Lutyens 1995, pp. 1–2, footnote 2. "Kumara Shrowtulu, one of the greatest astrologers in the Ceded Districts." Quoted from a 1911 statement by Krishnamurti's father dictated and signed in the presence of two witnesses. It details the circumstances of Krishnamurti's birth. Original [c. 1995] at the Adyar Archive, Theosophical Society Adyar; Theosophist 1932, § "Introduction" p. 42. "I give below a copy of the horoscope in Sanskrit and in translation, made by the Hindu astrologer at the birth of Krishnamurti. ... The original horoscope is in Sanskrit. I presume it is written on palm leaf ..." By C. Jinarajadasa, then a high-ranking Theosophist, who first met Krishnamurti shortly after the latter was "discovered". From an article in the April 1932 issue of The Theosophist magazine. Includes copies of the original Jyotisa (Jataka Shastra) Vedic natal charts and the English translation Theosophist 1932; M. Lutyens 1995. "The copies published by Jinarajadasa were copies of the original in [Krishnamurti's father's] writing". Per the horoscope, Krishnamurti's birth was at 00:30 am local time (GMT+5:30) of Sunday, 12 May 1895 according to the Gregorian calendar, or at 12:30 (past midnight local time) of Saturday, 11 May 1895 according to a westernized rendition of the Hindu calendar. [This date and time was also agreed upon separately by Krishnamurti's father in the 1911 statement. There had been conflicting reports about Krishnamurti's actual birth date and time].) and adds commentary and biographical notes. (Note: [Note biographical details about the room where Krishnamurti's mother gave birth to him, and information regarding his sexual life, have been superseded, amended or corrected by sources newer than the relevant ones referenced in the article; M. Lutyens 1995, preface. Location of his birth; sexual life: Sloss 1991, p. 117; M. Lutyens 1996, "Chapter 1"].)
- Gardner, Martin (July–August 2000). "David Bohm and Jiddo [sic] Krishnamurti". Critical article in the Skeptical Inquirer magazine questions Bohm's and Krishnamurti's philosophical views, as well as the significance of their dialogue. (Note: David Bohm (in Jiddu Krishnamurti bibliography).) Krishnamurti critique draws heavily on the book Lives in the Shadow with J. Krishnamurti, listed in Other biographies above.
- Eyres, Harry (21 May 2005). "Rare retreat without restrictions". Article in the Financial Times newspaper about the Krishnamurti Centre at Brockwood Park, England, (Note: JKO. "The Krishnamurti Centres are intended for the study of the teachings of J. Krishnamurti. They are for people who would like to be in an environment of quietness and great natural beauty, where they can give full attention to these teachings and their implications in their own lives." Webpage includes links to the Centres.) includes a short summary of Krishnamurti's life and message. The author calls his encounters with Krishnamurti's message an "unfailingly bracing and chastening experience".

=== Artistic depictions ===
Film, television, and theater

- Lucas, George et al. (1993). "The Young Indiana Jones Chronicles: Benares, January 1910". Episode in Emmy Award winning American television series created by George Lucas. The series explores the childhood and youth of the fictional character Indiana Jones, and in this episode, "old Indy attempts to enlighten a down on his luck trucker by telling him about the most extraordinary person he ever met: Krishnamurti." Role of young Krishnamurti played by the Indian actor Hemanth Rao. (Note: Hemanth Rao at IMDb.) [Fact-based fictional representation].

Literature and poetry

- Beyer, Lynne (1993). "Krishnamurti's Journal". Short poem apparently inspired by one of Krishnamurti's published diaries. (Note: The poem is based on Krishnamurti's diaries, see Jiddu Krishnamurti bibliography § Krishnamurti on Krishnamurti, including the eponymous Krishnamurti's Journal; it was republished in the "Summer 1993" issue of Grand Street (Beyer 1993b).)
- Jeffers, Robinson (1927). "Credo". Jeffers had reputedly written this poem about Krishnamurti, whom he met and befriended in the mid-1930s. (Note: M. Lutyens 2003a, pp. 31–32; however see Williams 2004, p. 517 [in "Notes": no. 10]; Brophy 1986.)

Indian Classical Dance Inspired by Jiddu Krishnamurti's teachings, Dega Deva Kumar Reddy, an alumnus of Rishi Valley School conceptualized and produced 'Essence of Life' dance form with five classical Indian dance schools - Bharatanatyam, Kuchipudi, Odissi, Kathak and Mohiniyattam across India. Essence of Life received rare accolades.

Music and song Krishnamurti's message has found resonance in the life and work of composers, performers and songwriters in a variety of music genres. He has been cited as an influence in the artistic and personal development of pioneering jazz musician John Coltrane and has been similarly acknowledged by singer-songwriter Van Morrison, (Note: Heylin 2003, p. 393; Morrison's 1986 recording No Guru, No Method, No Teacher owes its title to a common Krishnamurti theme – one example is at J. Krishnamurti 1978, para. 15.) and Garry Cobain of the experimental electronic music act The Future Sound of London, among others.

- Kno (2010). "The New Day (Death Has No Meaning)". Recording by hip-hop producer and artist Kno. Lyrics mainly consist of excerpts of Krishnamurti from a discussion with David Bohm in 1980. Included in Kno's collection Death is Silent. The collection also contains the track "Loneliness", which briefly samples Krishnamurti from the same discussion. (Note: Krishnamurti & Bohm 2009, "Dialogue Seven – part 7 of 8".)
- Kokolo (2004). More Consideration. The Afrobeat band Kokolo has stated that Krishnamurti's message was a major influence in the making of this recording.
- Kollektiv Turmstrasse (2010). "Addio Addio". Production by German electronic dance music duo Kollektiv Turmstrasse, incorporates audio excerpts from a Krishnamurti talk. Included in their 2010 recording Rebellion Der Träumer (in German). (Rebellion of the Dreamer).
- Lindberg, Christian (2008). "Visions and Non Thoughts, for chorus & trombone". This piece, by classical and contemporary music trombonist Christian Lindberg was commissioned by the Swedish Radio Choir and Concerts Sweden, and incorporates text by Krishnamurti, among others. Included in the 2010 recording Visions and Non Thoughts by the Swedish Radio Choir, conducted by Ragnar Bohlin. (Note: Serinus 2010. Review.)
- Live (1991). Mental Jewelry. This recording by the rock band Live has many lyrical references to Krishnamurti's teachings.

Visual arts The French expressionist sculptor Antoine Bourdelle produced drawings and two bronze busts of him in the 1920s, (Note: Blau 1995, pp. 66–67; Williams 2004, p. 164.) while photographers Cecil Beaton and Edward Weston each shot several portraits and studies, a number of which illustrated Krishnamurti books. (Note: M. Lutyens 1991, pp. vii [in "Illustrations"], 140. According to Mary Lutyens, Krishnamurti did not allow photographs of him to be taken for over 30 years, from the early 1930s to the late 1960s, "hence the lack of pictures of him in middle age". [She states that he relented in the late 1960s, allowing freelance photographer Mark Edwards to photograph him in 1968. Photographer weblink retrieved 20 January 2011. Edwards eventually shot several portraits of Krishnamurti, some of which illustrate covers of Krishnamurti books. He also covered Krishnamurti gatherings, and undertook various assignments for the Krishnamurti Foundations. See for example J. Krishnamurti 2000. Photobook based on Krishnamurti quotations about nature and the environment with accompanying nature photography from various photographers]; Williams 2004, p. 552 [in "Notes": no. 53]. However private photographs of Krishnamurti in middle-age have been published in Sloss 1991; photographs of him from that era also exist in The Huntington Library, San Marino, California; Coleman 1971, pp. 81, 90, 98. "[Krishnamurti c. 1969] told me he never allowed photographs if he could help it because he was afraid some people might misuse them. There were those who wished to deify him and pictures would give them a means of doing so. The thought horrified him." Coleman, who originally met Krishnamurti in 1958, asked him to allow a photograph as illustration for his book, and added, "He didn't like the idea at all but in the end gave in under pressure." [Note also the listing of portrait by Cecil Beaton is dated 1959].)

- Beaton, Cecil (1959). "J. Krishnamurti". Portrait, detail appears on the cover of the Second Penguin Krishnamurti Reader, originally published 1972. (Note: J. Krishnamurti 2002, Front cover.)
- Bourdelle, Emile-Antoine (1927). "Krishnamurti". Sculpture works: a terracota "Study", "Little Head with Base" (plaster), "Head with Base" (two bronzes). Listing included in a 1965 Bourdelle-retrospective publication; descriptions include contemporary [c. 1965] ownership, exhibition and reproduction information. (Note: Reproductions: Fontainas 1930, plate 54; Blau 1995, p. 65.)
- Weston, Edward (1935). "Jiddu Krishnamurti". Portrait, detail appears on the front cover of several imprints of The First and Last Freedom, paperback edition. (Note: J. Krishnamurti 1975, Front cover. Google Books [web preview publisher].)

=== Miscellaneous other ===
Conferences and symposia

- Thapan, Meenakshi (4–6 February 2010). Being Alive to Responsible Citizenship: J. Krishnamurti and the Challenge for Education. Non-academic conference organized by Thapan, Professor with the Department of Sociology at the University of Delhi. One of Thapan's specialties is the Sociology of education. Conference sponsored by the University of Delhi. (Note: Faculty member profile: Meenakshi Thapan (University of Delhi).; Lee 2010. Brief conference report, by the ex-CEO of the Krishamurti Foundation of America.)

Philately

- India Post (11 May 1987). J. Krishnamurti. English-language commemorative stamp, issued by the Indian Postal Service on the occasion of Krishnamurti's birthday. [Note birthdate used for the issue is according to a westernized rendition of the Hindu calendar]. M. Lutyens 1995 Photogravure in sepia and crimson based on an original photograph by Edward Weston. (Note: Center for Creative Photography. Copyright and image information for Edward Weston works.) Pupul Jayakar, Krishnamurti's longtime close friend, associate and authorized biographer, provided admiring biographical notes as part of the first day of issue information package. (Note: [Note reference weblink is not at Indian Postal Service or other official website].)

Webpage design

- Tanny, Phil (undated). "The Krishnamurti Widget". A portable video player application, this free Web widget "presents video of Krishnamurti in person, explaining his teachings in his own words." As of 31 December 2010, it aggregated over 200 videos originally posted on YouTube.

== See also ==
- Jiddu Krishnamurti bibliography

== Notes and sources ==
=== Sources for notes ===
- "About Brockwood". brockwood.org.uk. Bramdean: Krishnamurti Foundation Trust.
- "Band (about)". kokoloonline.com. New York: Kokolo.
- Berkman, Franya J. (2007). "Appropriating universality: The Coltranes and 1960s spirituality". American Studies. 48 (1 [Spring 2007]). Lawrence, Kansas: University of Kansas: 41–62. doi:10.1353/ams.0.0000. ISSN 0026-3079.
- Besant, Annie & Leadbeater, Charles W. (2003) [originally published 1924. Adyar: Theosophical Publishing House]. The Lives of Alcyone (in 2 volumes) (reprint of 1924 ed.). Whitefish, Montana: Kessinger Publishing.
  - Besant, Annie Wood; Leadbeater, Charles Webster (1 April 2003a). [Part 1]. Vol. 1. Kessinger. ISBN 978-0-7661-4812-3 – via Google Books.
  - Besant, Annie Wood; Leadbeater, Charles Webster (1 April 2003b). [Part 2]. Vol. 2. Kessinger. ISBN 978-0-7661-5381-3 – via Google Books.
- Beyer, Lynne (1993b). "Krishnamurti's Journal". Grand Street (46 [Summer 1993]). New York: Grand Street Publications: 213. doi:10.2307/25007686. ISSN 0734-5496. JSTOR 25007686. [jstor full access].
- Brophy, Robert (1986). "Robinson Jeffers and Krishnamurti". Robinson Jeffers Newsletter. 67 (July 1986). Long Beach, California: Robinson Jeffers Committee, Occidental College: 8–11. ISSN 0300-7936.
- Coleman, John E. (1971). The Quiet Mind. London: Rider. ISBN 978-0-09-106310-8.
- "Collections – Introduction". Center for Creative Photography. Tucson, Arizona: The University of Arizona.
- Fontainas, Andre (1930). Bourdelle. Paris: F. Rieder. OCLC 1087944.
- Heylin, Clinton (2003). Can you feel the silence?: Van Morrison, a new biography. Chicago: Chicago Review Press. ISBN 978-1-55652-517-9.
- Ionesco, Eugène (1982) [originally published (in French language) 1954. Paris: Éditions Gallimard]. The bald soprano, and other plays. Translated by Donald M. Allen. New York: Grove Press. ISBN 978-0-8021-3079-2. Google Books [web publisher].
- James, Clive (28 June 1981). "The SS criminals (Television)". The Observer. London. p. 44. ISSN 0029-7712.
- Jiddu, Krishnamurti (3 August 1929). The Dissolution of the Order of the Star (Speech). Ojai Star Camp 1929. J. Krishnamurti Online.
- —— (1970a) [originally published 1964 as This Matter of Culture. London: Victor Gollancz]. Desikacharya, Rajagopal (ed.). Think on These Things (reprint ed.). New York: Harper Perennial. ISBN 978-0-06-091609-1. Google Books [web preview publisher].
- —— (1970b). "A statement by Krishnamurti". Krishnamurti Foundation Trust Bulletin (7 [Summer 1970]). Bramdean: www.kfoundation.org, Krishnamurti Foundation Trust: 2–3. OCLC 62347551.
- —— (1975) [originally published 1954]. The first and last freedom (paperback). New York: Harper & Row. ISBN 978-0-06-064831-2.
- —— (31 December 1978). "First public talk in Madras". J.Krishnamurti Online. Krishnamurti Foundations. JKO 781231.
- —— (1984). "Intent of the Krishnamurti Schools". Journal of the Krishnamurti Schools. Chennai: www.kfionline.org, Krishnamurti Foundation India. OCLC 54980814. Archived from the original on 2 September 2009.
- —— (1996). Questioning Krishnamurti: J. Krishnamurti in dialogue. London: Thorsons. ISBN 978-0-7225-3284-3.
- —— (2000). Blau, Evelyne & Edwards, Mark (eds.). All the Marvelous Earth (hardcover). Ojai, California: Krishnamurti Publications of America. ISBN 978-1-888004-21-2.
- —— (2002) [originally published 1972. Harmondsworth, England: Penguin Books]. Lutyens, Mary (ed.). The second Krishnamurti reader (paperback). New Delhi: Penguin Books India. ISBN 978-0-14-302914-4.
- Jiddu, Krishnamurti & Bohm, David (April–May 2009). The ending of time (mp3; swf) (Webcast). J.Krishnamurti Online. JKO Krishnamurti Audios: The Ending of Time.
- Jiddu, Krishnamurti (Guest); Levin, Bernard (Interviewer) (2010). Interview with Bernard Levin (flv) (Webcast). Athens, Greece: The Krishnamurti Library of Athens.
- "Krishnamurti". Alpheus. Carol Stream, Illinois: Govert Schüller. 2001.
- Lee, Mark (March 2010). "Being alive to responsible citizenship; report from India (Krishnamurti conference in India)". kfa.org. Ojai, California: Krishnamurti Foundation of America. KFA enews. Archived from the original on 20 March 2012.
- Looseleaf, Victoria (18 January 2009). "Puppet who can partner; the title character of 'Wonderboy,' from Joe Goode's troupe, has a message about the artist as outsider". The Los Angeles Times (Home ed.). p. F.12. ISSN 0458-3035.
- Nuxoll, Kelly (15 June 2011). "Seeds: one man's serendipitous journey to find the trees that inspired famous American writers from Faulkner to Kerouac, Welty to Wharton (Books)". The Christian Science Monitor. Boston: Christian Science Publishing Society. p. 19. ISSN 0882-7729.
- Schiffman, Jean (22 November 2007). "Bringing spirituality to your acting". Back Stage West. 14 (47). Los Angeles: VNU Business Publications: 14. ISSN 1531-572X.
- Serinus, Jason V. (22 June 2010). "Visions and non thoughts". sfcv.org. San Francisco: San Francisco Classical Voice.
- "Study Centres". J.Krishnamurti Online. Krishnamurti Foundations.
- "The Future Sound of London Interview". Barcodezine.com. London: Barcode Magazine. Archived from the original on 27 September 2011.
- "The original Hindu horoscope of J. Krishnamurti". Theosophist Magazine January 1932 – April 1932 (reprint [compilation] ed.). Whitefish, Montana: Kessinger Publishing. 2003 [originally in The Theosophist monthly. Annie Besant; Curuppumullage Jinarajadasa eds]. 53 (7 [April 1932]): pp. 42–45. ISBN 978-0-7661-5202-1. Google Books [web preview publisher].
- "Welcome to Blue Dove Online". bluedove.net. Mendocino, California: Wells Productions. 2004. Archived from the original on 10 January 2016.
- Williams, Christine V. (2004). Jiddu Krishnamurti: world philosopher (1895–1986): his life and thoughts. Delhi: Motilal Banarsidass. ISBN 978-81-208-2032-6 – via Google Books.
- —— (2004a). J. Krishnamurti: Crossing cultural borders or ignoring their existence? (PDF). 15th Biennial Conference of the Asian Studies Association of Australia. Canberra, Australia: Australian National University. Archived from the original (PDF) on 8 June 2011.
