= At the Feet of the Master =

1910 book attributed to Jiddu Krishnamurti

- 1911 edition
- Author: Alcyone (Jiddu Krishnamurti)
- Language: English
- Subject: Religious text, Theosophy
- Published: December 1910 by Theosophist Office (1st edition)
- Publication place: India
- Media type: Print (cloth)
- Pages: 84
- OCLC: 465903996
- Text: At the Feet of the Master at Wikisource
- Wikisource has the 1911 US edition

At the Feet of the Master is a book attributed to Jiddu Krishnamurti (1895–1986), authored when he was 14 years old. Written under the name Alcyone, it was first published in 1910. The work was closely related to the World Teacher Project, a contemporary messianic endeavor launched by the Theosophical Society. The book is considered a spiritual classic and was still in print in 2012. By that time it had been published in dozens of editions and had been translated in many languages; by 2004 early editions were in the public domain. Throughout its publication history the work has generated controversy regarding the author's identity.

== Background ==
The work was an important early milestone of the World Teacher Project, a worldwide enterprise launched by the Theosophical Society in early 20th century. This endeavor, which received widespread publicity, proclaimed the imminent arrival of the World Teacher, a new Messiah. Jiddu Krishnamurti, an adolescent Brahmin from South India, and the presumed author of At the Feet of the Master, was considered the likely "vehicle" for the World Teacher. As a result, the book was seen as being closely related to Krishnamurti's expected mission, an early indication of his spiritual and worldly destiny.

== About the work ==
Frontispiece of the 1911 US edition.

The title was reputedly chosen by Annie Besant, then–President of the Theosophical Society, who was also Krishnamurti's legal guardian. The author was listed as Alcyone, a pseudonym assigned to Krishnamurti by one of his mentors, the prominent and controversial Theosophist Charles Webster Leadbeater.

The original edition's front cover features an illustration (in gold on blue background), of a path leading to an Egyptian-style gateway; in the frontispiece there is a contemporary photograph of Alcyone. The book includes a preface by Besant, and a dedication page with the inscription, "To those who knock". Following, is an additional full-page photograph of Alcyone (uncaptioned), a page with a short, unattributed quote in Sanskrit and English, and a foreword by Alcyone. The body of the work is then laid out in four parts, corresponding to its proclaimed requirements for disciples on the spiritual path:

- Discrimination
- Desirelessness
- Good conduct
- Love

The book closes with an unsigned, two-verse devotional poem.

The following is stated in the book's foreword: "These are not my words; they are the words of the Master who taught me." This is related to Leadbeater's statement that over a period of about five months during 1909–10, Master Kuthumi (or Koot Hoomi) – a postulated embodied spiritual entity – was releasing to Krishnamurti, through a mystical process and while the boy was asleep, the spiritual instruction that makes up the work. Upon waking, Krishnamurti "with great laboriousness" put the instructions into notes; afterwards, the notes were checked for spelling and grammar, and then arranged and typed by Leadbeater. The resulting typescript formed the basis for the book's original edition; Krishnamurti's handwritten notes were lost sometime after the book's publication.

== Publication history ==
The original edition was published at Adyar, India, through the facilities of The Theosophist, the Society's main organ; the publisher is listed as "Theosophist Office, Adyar". The book, introduced during the December 1910 Theosophical Convention at Adyar, was bound in blue cloth, with a limited number of copies bound in blue leather.

This edition quickly sold out; within a year the book had been published in twenty-seven editions, and by 1925 there were at least forty. In the ensuing decades, dozens of editions in many languages and formats were published by Theosophical and non-Theosophical publishers, including the Star Publishing Trust (SPT), publishing arm of the World Teacher Project. Following its founding in 1926, the SPT had assumed the copyright to the work. This entity became the official publisher of Krishnamurti's work after he effectively ended the World Teacher Project by rejecting his messianic role and leaving the Theosophical Society in 1929–30; however, the SPT still held the rights to At the Feet of the Master as of 1946. Meanwhile, according to one source, the original edition of the book may have never been legally copyrighted.

The book is considered a spiritual classic, and was still in print in 2012. Around that time, early editions of the work had been in the public domain within several jurisdictions.

=== Select editions ===
Later editions may list the author as both Alcyone and Jiddu Krishnamurti, or solely as Jiddu Krishnamurti. They may also omit material, or add new material.

- Alcyone (Jiddu Krishnamurti) (1911). At the feet of the master (hardcover). Preface by Besant, Annie (American ed.). Chicago: Rajput Press. 84 pp. OCLC 560831417 – edition is in the public domain.
- Jiddu, Krishnamurti (1990). At the feet of the master (hardcover). Preface by Besant, Annie; illustrated by Eedle, Alfred. London: Rider. 128 pp. ISBN 978-0-7126-3615-5. Back cover: "An illustrated text of the teachings given to the spiritual teacher, Krishnamurti, by his own guru [publisher's annotation]."
- Jiddu, Krishnamurti (Alcyone) (2001). At the feet of the master and towards discipleship (paperback). Preface by Besant, Annie; additional material by Algeo, John (1st Quest ed.). Wheaton, Illinois: Quest Books. 112 pp. ISBN 978-0-8356-0803-9 – expanded edition includes "Towards Discipleship", a previously published private transcript of informal 1924 talks by Krishnamurti, and background material by John Algeo, past president of the Theosophical Society in America.

== Reception ==
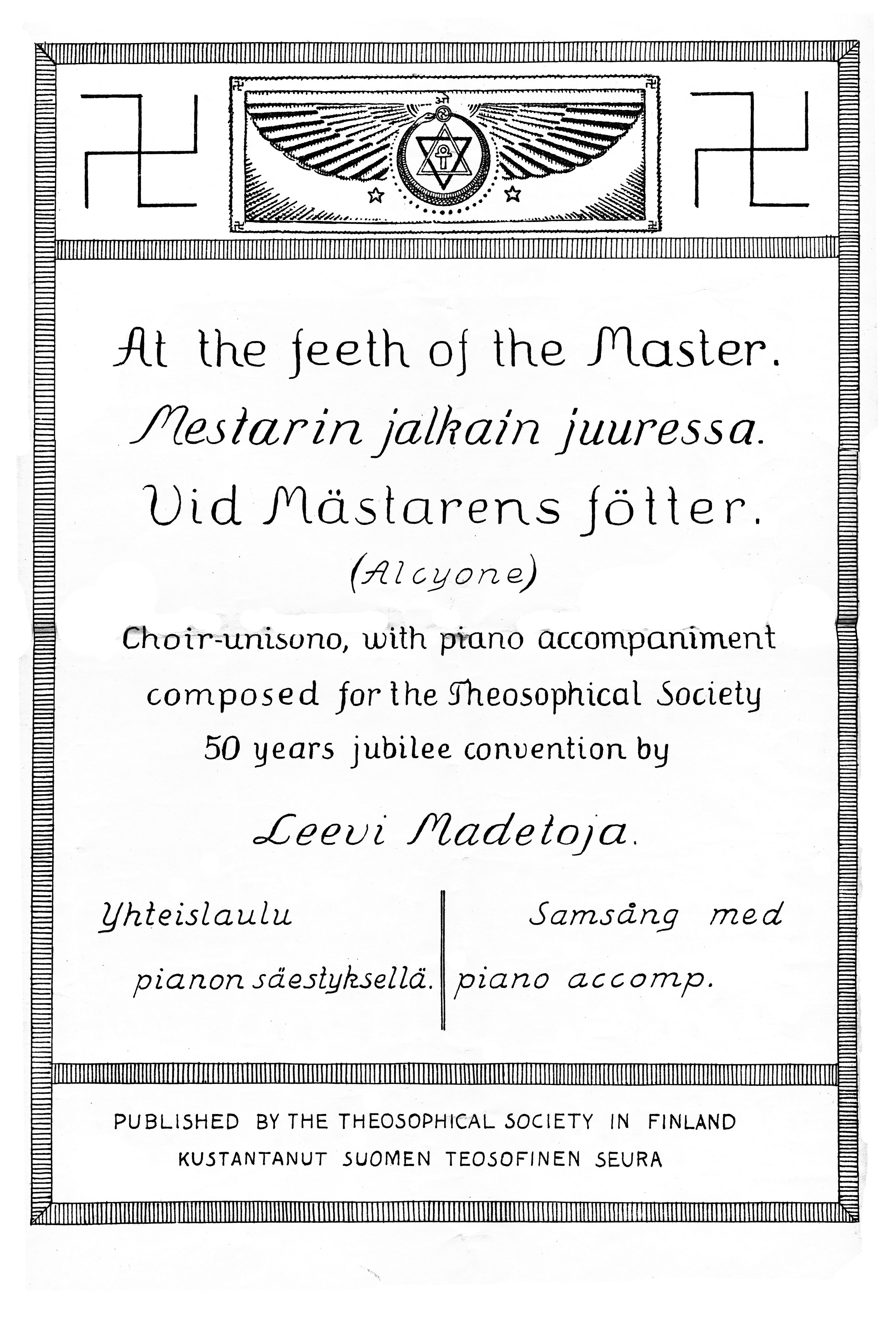
Original front cover of Leevi Madetoja's 1925 composition "At the feeth [sic] of the Master (Alcyone)".

The book was enthusiastically received by Theosophists and members of the Order of the Star in the East, a worldwide organization established by the Theosophical leadership to promote the World Teacher Project. According to a Krishnamurti biographer, "[n]othing, since Blavatsky, carried the sort of authority soon ascribed to Alcyone's document"; contemporary press reports described it as "a holy book to his [Alcyone-Krishnamurti] disciples". In 1925 the Finnish Section of the Theosophical Society published "At the feeth [sic] of the Master (Alcyone)" – a work for voice and piano by the composer Leevi Madetoja (Op. 71/2); the composition, whose lyrics include the book's closing poem, was commissioned by the Section for the 50th anniversary of the parent organization's founding. It was republished as "The Word of the Master" (Finnish: Mestarin käsky) in 1929.

The extraordinary publicity surrounding Krishnamurti and the World Teacher Project brought increased attention to the book. Favorable early press coverage was complemented by more neutral or strict assessments, which included the tentative characterization of Krishnamurti's writing style as "artless".

Others have found the book "simple ... though not platitudinous ... draws on the pious morality that underlies ... all [religions]". It has been pointed out that the main body's themes, and four-part layout, are similar to Advaita Vedanta treatises by or attributed to, the 8th century Indian philosopher and theologian Adi Shankara.

Despite the demise of the World Teacher Project in 1929, and the subsequent dismantling of the infrastructure supporting it (which included the book), millions of copies have been sold. Soon after its original publication, commentaries and detailed analyses by prominent Theosophists started to appear, "in which every line of Alcyone's original is weighed, analyzed, laboriously expanded upon"; in addition, the book became a frequent subject of lectures, a practice that continued past the Project's ending, and into the early 21st century. The work reputedly also played a role in later occult endeavors by Leadbeater.

=== Authorship debate ===
The identity of the author has been debated since the appearance of the first edition. It has been proposed that Leadbeater was the actual producer of the work; this proposition has had opponents as well as supporters. Shortly after the original publication, the matter found its way to court in India. It was brought up during a custody battle over Krishnamurti between Besant and Jiddu Narayaniah, Krishnamurti's father. Narayaniah believed the book was "fathered" on Krishnamurti in order to promote his messianic credentials, citing as one proof the boy's poor prior knowledge of English. In related litigation, Besant alleged The Hindu newspaper was in contempt over the "publication of certain correspondence ... relating to the authorship of the book 'At the feet of the Master'".

Since the original publication, statements reputedly made by Krishnamurti have appeared in a variety of sources, implying he accepted or rejected authorship; his own recorded statements on the matter have been subject to interpretation. Decades after the original publication, he stated that he had no memory of writing it, although he did not discount the possibility.

As the original notes by Krishnamurti are missing, the extent of any differences with Leadbeater's typescript and with the original published edition is not clear. The debate regarding the role of Krishnamurti in the production and promotion of this work persisted, a century after its original publication.

== See also ==
- Jiddu Krishnamurti bibliography
