= Freedom from the Known =

Book by Jiddu Krishnamurti

- First edition (US)
- Editor: Mary Lutyens
- Author: Jiddu Krishnamurti
- Language: English
- Subject: Philosophy
- Published: 1969 (Harper & Row)
- Publication place: United States
- Media type: Print
- Pages: 124 (first edition)
- ISBN: 978-0-06-064808-4

Freedom from the Known is a book by Jiddu Krishnamurti (1895–1986), originally published 1969.

== About the work ==
The book contains excerpts from previously unpublished Krishnamurti talks selected and edited by Mary Lutyens. Lutyens was one of his authorized biographers and a lifelong friend.

== Select editions ==
- Jiddu, Krishnamurti (2010). Lutyens, Mary (ed.). Freedom from the Known. London: Rider Books. 144 pp. ISBN 978-1-84604-213-3.

== See also ==
- Jiddu Krishnamurti bibliography
