= Krishnamurti to Himself =

1987 book based on a spoken diary of Jiddu Krishnamurti

- First US edition
- Author: Jiddu Krishnamurti
- Language: English
- Subject: Autobiography, philosophy
- Publisher: Gollancz (UK); Harper & Row (US)
- Publication date: 1987
- Publication place: United Kingdom and United States
- Media type: Print (hardcover, paperback)
- Pages: 134 pp (first edition)
- ISBN: 978-0-575-04060-1 (UK); 978-0-06-064877-0 (US)

Krishnamurti to Himself, subtitled His Last Journal, is a book based on a spoken diary of 20th-century Indian philosopher Jiddu Krishnamurti (1895–1986). It discusses psychological, social and spiritual issues he addressed throughout his long career, and like previous diaries includes observations of nature remarked for their originality and nuance; it is however unique in being the only one of his works in this format. Originally recorded in 1983–84, it was first published in print in 1987.

== About the work ==
The text was transcribed from audiotape recordings made by Krishnamurti at his home in Ojai, California. He recorded the monologues while alone, at irregular intervals and occasionally in batches of consecutive days, between 25 February 1983 and 30 March 1984. (Note: Audio and other original Krishnamurti materials are collected in official archives (KFA n.d.); a segment of the first recording for 11 March 1983 (J. Krishnamurti 1993, pp. 17–19) is also available in an official podcast; additional recordings from the work have been published.) In print, the recordings are organized in twenty-seven dated sections of a few pages each; in two cases there are multiple recordings on the same date, published in separate sections. The transcription was minimally edited by Mary Lutyens, an authorized Krishnamurti biographer and longtime friend.

The work was reputedly prompted by the success of the previously published diary Krishnamurti's Journal. Due to his advanced age, Krishnamurti opted to dictate the new diary instead of writing it, using a portable tape recorder. Alternating between second-person and third-person narratives, and occasionally with the help of an imaginary conversation partner, he delves on subjects that were common concerns during his long speaking career. Among them, the importance of right relationship, the unhealthy consequences of identification, the significance of meditation, the dangers of conditioned thinking, and "the extraordinary simplicity of dying”.

A commentator wrote that this and previous diaries are "worth seeking for the sheer power of the language alone" while Lutyens stated in foreword, "The reader gets very close to Krishnamurti in these pieces – almost, it seems at moments, into his very consciousness. ... The gist of Krishnamurti's teaching is here, and the descriptions of nature with which he begins most of the pieces may for many,... quieten their whole being so that they become intuitively receptive to what follows."

== Publication history ==
The book was originally published in June 1987 by Gollancz in the UK, and by Harper & Row in the US. A trade paperback edition was published in the US in January 1993 by HarperOne. The editions' front covers feature an author portrait; as was the case with Krishnamurti's Journal, there is no table of contents, with the first dated section beginning immediately after the foreword by Lutyens.

Copyright was held by the Krishnamurti Foundation Trust, a UK entity. As of 2021, publishing rights were managed by Krishnamurti Publications, the global distributor of Krishnamurti works; the book was listed in their online trade catalog as available in several languages and dialects.

=== Select editions ===
- Jiddu, Krishnamurti (1993). Krishnamurti to himself: his last journal (trade paperback). Foreword by Lutyens, Mary (1st US paperback ed.). San Francisco: HarperOne. 134 pp. ISBN 978-006250649-8. OCLC 26262314.

== Reception ==
Soon after initial publication the work was noted by journals on philosophy and current affairs; additionally, Krishnamurti's approach to choiceless awareness and to insight, as presented in this diary, has been commented upon in psychotherapy journals. The book is one of the sources in a scholarly comparison of the Russian author Lev Tolstoy's ideas on consciousness with Krishnamurti's exposition of the subject, and it has been cited in diverse works, such as in India-focussed sociocultural commentaries and academic journal articles on feminist perspectives of health reform and globalization.

The book was mentioned in newspaper articles discussing Krishnamurti's worldwide influence on education, and has been a designated text in college-level courses on education and ecology. Entries from the diary have appeared in the popular press, while some readers of the work have remarked on its perceived soothing quality.

== See also ==
- Jiddu Krishnamurti bibliography
- Krishnamurti's Journal
- Krishnamurti's Notebook
