= The First and Last Freedom =

1954 book by Jiddu Krishnamurti

- First US edition 1954
- Author: Jiddu Krishnamurti
- Language: English
- Subject: Philosophy
- Published: 1954 (1st edition) (UK: Gollancz, US: Harper & Brothers); 2010 (1st digital edition) (HarperCollins eBooks)
- Publication place: United Kingdom, United States
- Media type: Digital (ebook); Print (hardcover, paperback)
- Pages: 288 (1st edition)
- ISBN: 978-0-06-204529-4 (1st digital edition)
- OCLC: 964457 (1st US edition)
- LC Class: B133.K7 F5

The First and Last Freedom is a book by 20th-century Indian philosopher Jiddu Krishnamurti (1895–1986). Originally published in 1954 with a comprehensive foreword by Aldous Huxley, it was instrumental in broadening Krishnamurti's audience and exposing his ideas. It was one of the first Krishnamurti titles in the world of mainstream, commercial publishing, where its success helped establish him as a viable author. The book also established a format frequently used in later Krishnamurti publications, in which he presents his ideas on various interrelated issues, followed by discussions with one or more participants. As of 2022 several editions of the work had been published, in print and digital media.

== Background ==
Following his dismantling of the World Teacher Project in 1929–30, Jiddu Krishnamurti embarked on a new international speaking career as an independent, unconventional philosopher. During World War II he remained at his residence in Ojai, California, in relative isolation. English author Aldous Huxley lived nearby; he met Krishnamurti in 1938, and the two men became close friends. Huxley encouraged Krishnamurti to write, and also introduced his work to Harper, Huxley's own publisher. This eventually led to the addition of Krishnamurti in the publisher's roster of authors; (Note: Rajagopal Sloss 2011, p. 252. Radha Rajagopal Sloss, daughter of D. Rajagopal, Krishnamurti's business manager at the time, states that Huxley introduced her father to the publisher. She adds that Krishnamurti had little interest in his manuscripts or other records of his work; this lack of interest by Krishnamurti is also remarked upon by his biographers (Lutyens 2003, pp. 87–88).) until that time Krishnamurti works were published by small or specialist presses, or in-house by a variety of Krishnamurti-related organizations.

== About the work ==
The thinker comes into being through thought;

— Jiddu Krishnamurti, The First and Last Freedom, "Questions and Answers: 21. On Sex"

As is the case with most Krishnamurti texts, the book consists of edited excerpts from his public talks and discussions; it includes examinations of subjects that were, or became, recurrent themes in his exposition: the nature of the self – and of belief, investigations into fear and desire, the relationship between thinker and thought, the concept of choiceless awareness, the function of the mind, etc. Following an introductory chapter by Krishnamurti, each of twenty interrelated topics is covered in its own chapter. A second part ("Questions and Answers") consists of 38 named segments, taken from question-and-answer sessions between Krishnamurti and his audience; the segments broadly pertain to the topics covered in the book's first part. The work was edited (without attribution) by D. Rajagopal, Krishnamurti's then–close associate, editor, and business manager; the included extracts were taken from "Verbatim Reports" of Krishnamurti talks between 1947 and 1952.

Huxley provided a ten-page foreword as comprehensive introduction to Krishnamurti's philosophy, an essay that "... no doubt contributed to [the book's] credibility and sales potential" and he may have also influenced the overall structure and style of the work. He had read a then–recent Krishnamurti book in 1941 (Note: Williams 2004, pp. 260–261. According to a detailed Krishnamurti bibliography, almost all known texts of his from that period were full or partial transcripts of his talks and discussions, published in a variety of print media.) and was favorably impressed, especially with a section consisting of dialogues and question-and-answer sessions between Krishnamurti and his listeners – a practice that normally followed his lectures. Huxley thought they enlivened Krishnamurti's philosophical subjects, and suggested a similar format for the forthcoming book, which also became a common type of presentation in later Krishnamurti publications.

A commentator summarized that in this and other books "Krishnamurti emphasized the importance of release from entrapment in the 'network of thought' through a perceptual process of attention, observation or 'choiceless awareness' which would release the true perception of reality without mediation of any authority, or guru." Another stated that it was instrumental in making Krishnamurti and his ideas known to a wider audience, as the "... first substantial statement of his philosophy to be issued by major publishing houses in Britain and the United States"; noting the work's popularity among the college-age young, others added that the book "... anticipated the preoccupations of an up-and-coming youth culture, and ... perhaps helped to form it".

As in practically every work of his Krishnamurti did not present this book as containing "... a doctrine to be believed, but as an invitation to others to investigate and validate its truth for themselves"

Our problem is how to be free from all conditioning. Either you say it is impossible, that no human mind can ever be free from conditioning, or you begin to experiment, to inquire, to discover. ... Now I say it is definitely possible for the mind to be free from all conditioning – not that you should accept my authority. If you accept it on authority, you will never discover, ... and that will have no significance. ... [I]f you are to find the truth of it for yourself, you must experiment with it and follow it swiftly.

— Jiddu Krishnamurti, The First and Last Freedom, "Questions and Answers: 20. On the Conscious and Unconscious Mind"

== Publication history ==
The book was originally published in May 1954 by Harper in the US and by Gollancz in the UK. In the US, it was the second Krishnamurti-authored book to be published by a mainstream commercial publisher – unlike in other markets, where this would be the first such publication. (Note: In the US, Harper had published Education and the Significance of Life by Krishnamurti in 1953 (OCLC 177139); however, this title was published after The First and Last Freedom in the UK and elsewhere (Lutyens 2003, p. 86; Williams 2004, p. 308).) Copyright was held by Krishnamurti Writings (KWINC), the organization then responsible for promoting Krishnamurti's work worldwide; (Note: Williams 2004, p. 266. Elsewhere, Williams states that according to Krishnamurti associate Ingram Smith, D. Rajagopal, as the head of KWINC, had offered to buy back from Gollancz any unsold inventory of the book's first edition.) publishing rights were transferred to new Krishnamurti-related organizations in the mid-1970s (the Krishnamurti foundations), and in early 21st century, to Krishnamurti Publications (K Publications), an entity with overall responsibility for publishing his works worldwide.

The book was "an immediate success" and was in its 6th impression by the end of 1954; a 2015 reprint of a 1975 paperback edition was the edition's 51st print run. Opening to good reviews, it proved to be a "compelling entry" into publishing, helping to establish Krishnamurti as a viable author in the commercial publishing arena. Unlike the editions of the 1950s and 60s, later editions of the work (such as one listed below), may include a variety of Krishnamurti photographs on the front cover. A digital edition in several ebook formats was first published by HarperCollins eBooks in 2010.

About a third of the work was included in The Penguin Krishnamurti Reader, a 1970 compilation edited by Krishnamurti biographer Mary Lutyens that was also a commercial and critical success. (Note: The Penguin Krishnamurti Reader (1970, vol. 1, 1st ed., ISBN 978-01-4003071-6, OCLC 120824); Lutyens 2003, p. 162; Williams 2004, p. 386.) In addition, Penguin Books through its Ebury Publishing division published a new edition of The First and Last Freedom in 2013, with an edition-specific Preface. This was marketed as a mass market paperback by the division's Rider imprint, and as an ebook by its digital media imprint.

According to one source as of 2022 there had been 95 editions in several formats by a variety of publishers, published in eight languages. (Note: WorldCat 2022; one licensee was the publishing arm of the Theosophical Society in America, whose parent organization had sponsored the World Teacher Project – see The First and Last Freedom at Google Books (1968 Theosophical Publishing ed., OCLC 218764); as of 2015 Theosophical organizations were scheduling events based on the work (Adelaide Theosophical Society 2016); the licensing of this and other Krishnamurti titles to Theosophical publishers became a point of contention (and item in litigation) between D. Rajagopal and Krishnamurti (Rajagopal Sloss 2011, p. 304; Ventura County Star 1973); the latter had disassociated from Theosophy several decades earlier (Vernon 2001, pp. 183–186).) Several years prior the work had been made available as a freely readable electronic document through J. Krishnamurti Online (JKO), the official Jiddu Krishnamurti online repository.

=== Select editions ===
- Jiddu, Krishnamurti (May 1954). The First and Last Freedom (hardcover). Foreword by Huxley, Aldous (1st UK ed.). London: Gollancz. 288 pp. OCLC 59002436 – via Internet Archive.
- —— (26 March 1975). The First and Last Freedom (trade paperback). Foreword by Huxley, Aldous (reprint ed.). New York: HarperOne. 288 pp. ISBN 978-0-06-064831-2 – via Internet Archive. Reprints of this edition may have different covers and author photographs.
- —— (5 October 2010). The First and Last Freedom (ebook). Foreword by Huxley, Aldous (1st digital ed.). HarperCollins eBooks. 459 kB (EPUB). ISBN 978-0-06-204529-4 – via OverDrive.
- —— (1 August 2013). The First and Last Freedom (mass market paperback). Preface by Skitt, David; Foreword by Huxley, Aldous (new ed.). London: Rider. 352 pp. ISBN 978-18-46043-75-8.

== Reception ==
A Krishnamurti biographer wrote that Huxley's foreword "... set the mood to take the work very seriously", and another stated that by the end of May 1954 the book was responsible for attracting larger audiences to Krishnamurti's talks. Jean Burden, in a sympathetic 1959 article in the Prairie Schooner, partly attributed the increased interest in Krishnamurti to the book, while stating that as it was compiled from his "famous talks", it "... suffered, as most compilations do, from repetitiveness and lack of structure." Yet Anne Morrow Lindbergh reputedly found "'the sheer simplicity of what he [Krishnamurti] has to say ... breathtaking'."

Kirkus Reviews described it as a "... clear and intriguing presentation of a point of view which will appeal to many who are finding the more traditional approaches to truth to be blind alleys." A review at The Atlanta Journal and the Atlanta Constitution contended that Krishnamurti's thinking "... has the practical ring. It is so clear, so straightforward that the reader feels a challenge in every page". In contrast, The Times of India characterized the work's basic message as unoriginal and added that Krishnamurti's utterances have "... a fluid ambiguity and an almost insidious plausibility", before concluding that the work is "... all theoria without praxis, and in the present context appears to be mere escapism."

The Times Literary Supplement stated that for those who regard conflict "... as an unchangeable condition of human life and truth, Krishnamurti's teaching will seem to offer a delusive short-cut to a vaguely beatific freedom. But there is nothing vague about it. It is precise and penetrating." The reviewer thinks that Krishnamurti presents "... a reinterpretation of the wisdom of his race ... though he has rediscovered it for himself." However J. M. Cohen reviewing the book for The Observer (London) wrote, "Krishnamurti is an entirely independent master" adding, "[f]or those who wish to listen, this book will have a value beyond words."

The book's publication brought Krishnamurti and his ideas to the attention of practicing and theoretical psychotherapists, setting the stage for later dialogue between Krishnamurti and professionals in this field. It was also responsible for Krishnamurti's long and fruitful relationship with theoretical physicist David Bohm, whose unorthodox approach to problems of physics and of consciousness often correlated with Krishnamurti's philosophical views.

The work was mentioned in education-related dissertations as early as August 1954; it continued to be cited by educational researchers in the following decades. It has also interested researchers in psycholinguistics, drawing favorable remarks about Krishnamurti's views regarding the "... separation ... between the thinker and the thought"; and has featured in discussion of the relationship between general semantics and other viewpoints.

Among other fields, the book has been cited by occupational therapy papers, articles on medical ethics, and in original research of contemporary spirituality. But also in essays "on the social implications of the 'death of utopia'", and in addresses to professional geography conferences. It has been quoted in influential works on media and has been commended as an aid to successful investment strategies. Meanwhile, more than half a century after original publication, articles in general-interest media – for example, articles on meditation and mindfulness, favorably featured or mentioned the book.

The work has inspired artistic endeavors: It has been suggested that it influenced Huxley's writing of the 1962 novel Island while a 2014 painting exhibition in London was described as "... derived from two alternative perspectives: The introduction by Aldous Huxley in the book of his long-term colleague and friend, Jiddu Krishnamurti and Krishnamurti's second major opus, The First and Last Freedom". The book has also prompted comparisons between Krishnamurti's philosophy and Emily Dickinson's poetry, and has informed the way art therapy professionals approach their work.

According to an official Krishnamurti-related foundation, as of c. 2021 The First and Last Freedom had "... sold more copies than any other Krishnamurti book."

== See also ==
- Jiddu Krishnamurti bibliography
