= Krishnamurti's Notebook =

1976/2003 published diary of Jiddu Krishnamurti

- First edition (1976)
- Author: Jiddu Krishnamurti
- Language: English
- Subject: Autobiography, consciousness, philosophy
- Published: 1976 (1st edition) (UK: Gollancz, US: Harper & Row); 2003 (full text edition) (US: Krishnamurti Publications)
- Publication place: United Kingdom, United States
- Media type: Audio (audio file, CD); Digital (ebook); Print (hardcover, paperback)
- Pages: 252 (1st edition); 387 (full text edition)
- ISBN: 978-1-888004-57-1 (full text hardcover)
- OCLC: 54040143 (full text edition)
- LC Class: B5134.K75 A35

Krishnamurti's Notebook is a diary of 20th-century Indian philosopher Jiddu Krishnamurti (1895–1986). Written during 1961–62, it is best known for its first hand accounts of persistent, unusual physical experiences and states of consciousness, but also for poetic and penetrating descriptions of nature. It has been called "a remarkable mystical document" in press reports, while an authorized Krishnamurti biographer described it as containing "the whole essence" of his philosophy. Reputedly it was not intended for publication; the manuscript also became entangled in copyright and custody disputes. The work – one of few books Krishnamurti wrote himself – was eventually published in 1976 over objections of Krishnamurti associates. An expanded edition with additional material was published in 2003; it includes previously unpublished diary entries from 1962.

== About the work ==
In the evening it was there: suddenly it was there, filling the room, a great sense of beauty, power and gentleness. Others noticed it.

— Jiddu Krishnamurti, Krishnamurti's Notebook, "June 18 [1961 New York]"

Krishnamurti's first entry in this handwritten journal, quoted above in its entirety, is dated 18 June 1961 with the location given as New York City. Apart from a short break, he continued writing almost daily for the next nine months while at various locales in the US, the UK, Switzerland, France, Italy and India. There are about 214 entries in total, most of them one to two pages in length; the last entry, written in transit between Bombay (Mumbai) and Rome, is dated 19 March 1962. The published work is one of the very few books Krishnamurti wrote himself; almost all of his other books consist of edited or verbatim transcripts of his talks, discussions and dictations, or are curated collections of material from the same sources.

The diary portrays Krishnamurti's world from the inside; according to a commentator it provides "... a panorama of the landscape of Krishnamurti's daily consciousness." In particular, the diary describes Krishnamurti's experience of a nearly lifelong, often acutely painful condition he called the process, and perceptions of a state referred to as the otherness, among other terms. This state often (but not always) appeared concurrently with the process. As is the case with other Krishnamurti prose, diary entries include his impressions of nature, individuals and society, the descriptions of which have a "poetic quality" according to some.

The journal begins (and ends) without preamble; shortly before he started it, Krishnamurti reputedly experienced a recurrence of the process during May and June 1961 in London, witnessed by associates. In the time period covered by the diary, similar events were witnessed by other associates while Krishnamurti was in Switzerland in the summer of 1961; the diary and the events or states described, again reputedly perceived by others, continued upon his arrival to India in late autumn of the same year. Throughout this period Krishnamurti continued with his regular schedule of public talks and discussions.

The work was minimally edited for clarity and spelling by authorized Krishnamurti biographer Mary Lutyens, who provided the Foreword for the original edition (published 1976). In it she states, "[i]n this unique daily record we have what may be called the well-spring of Krishnamurti's teaching. The whole essence of his teaching is here, arising from its natural source." She adds elsewhere, "[a]part from its content, it is an extraordinary manuscript, 323 pages without a single erasure." Lutyens devoted a chapter to this book in the second volume of her biography of Krishnamurti, The Years of Fulfillment (published 1983). She records objections raised against the diary's publication by Krishnamurti associates who believed it presented him at odds with his public pronouncements; his response is included.

Lutyens had revealed the existence of the process in The Years of Awakening, the first volume of her biography of Krishnamurti (published 1975). This physical condition – which Krishnamurti and those around him did not consider as medical in nature – and experiences similar to the otherness, had reputedly originally appeared in 1922. At the time Krishnamurti was associated with the Theosophical Society and the related World Teacher Project. The existence and history of these experiences had remained unknown outside of the Theosophical Society leadership and Krishnamurti's circle of close associates and friends.

Roland Vernon, another of his biographers, states that previous attempts (by others) at revealing details from his past, including these reputed experiences, were suppressed by Krishnamurti. According to Vernon, Krishnamurti "... believed, with good reason, that the sensationalism of his early story would cloud the public's perception of his [then] current work". However Krishnamurti often hinted at otherness-like states in later talks and discussions; he was more expansive on the subject with close associates, also stating that the experience of the otherness continued as he was nearing death.

Around the time of the diary's original publication – more than fourteen years after the final entry – Krishnamurti stated, "I did not write it for publication ... I have attempted to put into words the actual pain and sensation which goes with the heightened consciousness."

The manuscript was entangled in personal and legal disputes between Krishnamurti and D. Rajagopal, Krishnamurti's past editor and business manager. An agreement reached in 1974 granted custody and copyright to the Krishnamurti Foundation Trust (KFT), a UK-based organization, and cleared the way for its eventual publication.

== Publication history ==
The first edition appeared in May 1976 via longtime Krishnamurti publishers Gollancz in the United Kingdom and Harper & Row in the United States.‍

The front and back covers of both impressions feature the same set of contemporary photographs of Krishnamurti. After the foreword by Lutyens there is a table of contents labeled "Itinerary", listing the places the diary was kept. Copyright was held by the Krishnamurti Foundation Trust. A paperback edition was first published in the US by Harper's Perennial Library imprint in 1978.

Following the discovery in the year 2000 of thirty-two additional diary pages, the work was republished in 2003 as the expanded "Full Text Edition" by Krishnamurti Publications, the official publisher and distributor of Krishnamurti's works. This edition appends the unpublished entries, numbering about 30, as they are dated (in 1962) immediately following the previously published ones. The endpapers consist of facsimiles of original diary pages, and there is another, edition-specific foreword; the updated "Itinerary" precedes both forewords. The edition features a photograph similar to the original edition's on the front cover (Krishnamurti alone in a nature setting); a 1935 portrait of his by Edward Weston is on the back cover. This edition's copyright was again registered to the KFT. It was followed by a paperback version in 2004.

The work was first published in digital media in 2008 as a Kindle ebook release of the full text edition. By 2010 print versions had several reprints, with the expanded edition offered in 13 languages and dialects; around the same time, the work was made freely available as an electronic document through J. Krishnamurti Online (JKO), the official Jiddu Krishnamurti online repository.

The full text edition was published by Blackstone Audio in 2017 as an unabridged audiobook read by Anthony Wren. It was released as a downloadable audio file; a CD audio version of the audiobook, published by Made for Success, was released in the US in March 2018 via Blackstone Publishing.

=== Original edition ===
- Jiddu, Krishnamurti (1976). Krishnamurti's Notebook (hardcover). Foreword by Lutyens, Mary (1st UK ed.). London: Gollancz. 252 pp. ISBN 978-0-575-02107-5.
- —— (1976). Krishnamurti's Notebook (hardcover). Foreword by Lutyens, Mary (1st US ed.). New York: Harper & Row. 252 pp. ISBN 0-06-064793-0. OCLC 2368483.

=== Select editions ===
- Jiddu, Krishnamurti (2004). Krishnamurti's Notebook (trade paperback). Foreword by Lutyens, Mary; Foreword by McCoy, Ray (full text paperback ed.). Ojai, California: K Publications. 392 pp. ISBN 978-1888004632.
- —— (2008). Krishnamurti's Notebook (Kindle ebook). Foreword by Lutyens, Mary; Foreword by McCoy, Ray (full text ed.). Ojai, California: K Publications. 2855 kB (KF8). ASIN B006Y65CIO – via Kindle Direct Publishing.
- —— (2017). Krishnamurti's Notebook (audio file). Read by Wren, Anthony (unabridged ed.). Ashland, Oregon: Blackstone Audio. Runtime 10 h 56 min. OCLC 985339657.

== Reception ==
The Library Journal stated in review, "[Krishnamurti's] insights are, as always, written in plain, nonsectarian language, and give perhaps the best picture we have today of the life of the spirit outside a strictly religious context." Publishers Weekly called the work a "luminous diary" and characterized Krishnamurti's teaching as "... austere, in a sense annihilating."

Kirkus Reviews described it as "[m]ore approachable, more intimate than Krishnamurti's didactic writings, this will speak ... to all readers with a feeling for the mystery of existence"; however London's Observer thought it better suited to those already familiar with Krishnamurti's life and outlook.

Krishnamurti was interviewed about the work by Gerald Priestland for the BBC Radio 4 program Chapter and Verse, which reviewed books of a religious or spiritual nature; the short interview and book review was broadcast on the evening of 30 May 1976.

The Guardian (London) carried a sympathetic report in June 1976; the article was not exclusively focused on the Notebook, also describing Krishnamurti's life and philosophy.

The reputed inner experiences recounted in the diary and in Lutyens' biography aroused the interest of Krishnamurti audiences. After their publication he was questioned by his listeners on the subject; he was dismissive of the importance of process-related events, insisted that any discussion of mystical experiences is trivial, and although he continued alluding to otherness-like states, he avoided any elaboration.

The book continued to attract attention and favorable mentions in the following decades. In its obituary of Krishnamurti, The Times (London), described it as "... a remarkable mystical document", while in 2006 the work was cited in a conference paper as "... probably ... the most extensive documentation to date of a mystic's inner thoughts, perceptions, and sensations".

== Other diaries ==
Following this diary's original publication, two other diaries of his were published in book form: Krishnamurti's Journal in 1982 and Krishnamurti to Himself in 1987.

== See also ==
- Jiddu Krishnamurti bibliography
