= Jiddu Krishnamurti bibliography =

Jiddu Krishnamurti
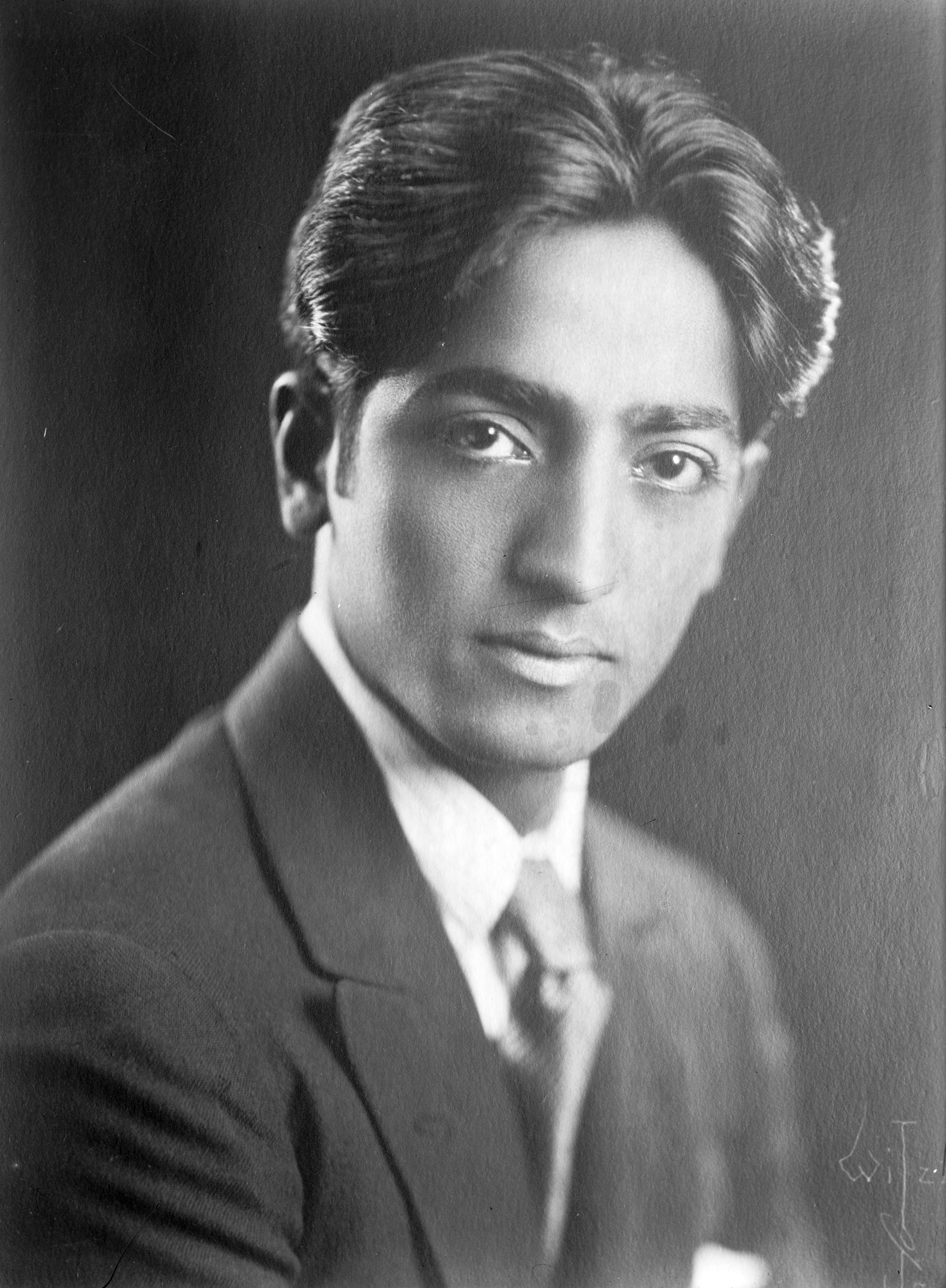
- J. Krishnamurti, circa 1920s
- Born: 12 May 1895; Madanapalle, Madras Presidency, British India (modern day Andhra Pradesh, India)
- Died: 17 February 1986 (aged 90); Ojai, California, US
- Occupations: Public speaker, author, philosopher
- Known for: His repudiation of claims he was to be a Messiah; uniquely expressed philosophy of life based on unflinching self-inquiry

Notes
- Often referred to solely or primarily by Krishnamurti, his given name; Jiddu is the family name

Jiddu Krishnamurti or J. Krishnamurti, (12 May 1895 – 17 February 1986) was a writer and speaker on philosophical and spiritual issues including psychological revolution, the nature of the mind, meditation, human relationships, and bringing about positive social change. He came to early prominence thanks to claims, made on his behalf, that he was to be a Messiah. As a young man he repudiated these claims and declared himself unbound by any tradition or philosophy. He spent the rest of his life presenting a uniquely expressed philosophy of life around the world in talks, discussions, and writings.

== About the works ==
=== Author biography ===
Jiddu Krishnamurti was born 1895 in the town of Madanapalle in then-colonial India, to a family of middle class Telugu Brahmins. His father was associated with the Theosophical Society, and in the early part of the 20th century young Krishnamurti was promoted by the Adyar, India based leadership of the Society as the so-called World Teacher, a new messiah. However, in 1929 he disavowed this role, dissolved the worldwide organization (the Order of the Star) formed to support it, and shortly afterwards severed his ties to Theosophy and the Theosophical Society.

Denouncing the concept of saviors, spiritual leaders, and any other intermediaries to reality, Krishnamurti stressed the need for a revolution in the psyche of every human being. He posited that such revolution cannot be brought about by any external entity, be it religious, political, or social. He urged people to directly discover the underlying causes of the problems facing individuals and society, and stated that such discovery is the natural outcome of absolute and unconditional psychological freedom, which he declared as being within everyone's reach.

Krishnamurti set out to work towards this goal of universal psychological freedom, and until his death in 1986 traveled the world as an independent speaker, presenting his message to large and small groups and in discussion with interested individuals; a large number of these talks and discussions have been published in various formats and media. He also articulated his message in writing, authoring several books and other works.

=== Distribution and availability ===
Official institutions

A number of successive non-profit institutions have been organized in order to preserve and disseminate Krishnamurti's work, originally by his Theosophist patrons, later by Krishnamurti and contemporary associates. As of 2010, the latest incarnations of the official Krishnamurti-related entities are the Krishnamurti Foundations, organized in the late 1960s to early 1970s. (Note: JKO & [a]. Foundations were organized in the United Kingdom, the United States, India, and Argentina (eventually relocated to Spain. As of 31 December 2010). Another institution was later organized in Canada; KFA 1969. Krishnamurti Foundation of America mission statement, similar in all Foundation charters. Copyright for the great majority of Krishnamurti's work is held by the Foundations individually or in joint ventures such as K Publications; Williams 2004, pp. 196–197, 528–529 [in "Notes": no. 50]. However, certain editions of early works are in the public domain within several jurisdictions. Notable among these are several editions of At the feet of the Master; University of California Libraries 2008, § "Selected metadata". "Evidence reported by Internet Archive biblio tool for item atfeetofmaster00krisrich on March 7, 2008: no visible notice of copyright; stated date is 1911." Other early works and correspondence may be copyright of the Theosophical Society Adyar. The matters of ownership and administration of intellectual property rights for Krishnamurti's work (and of other assets) became entangled in disputes that started in the 1960s, and in long-running litigation that formally begun in 1971. Most of the copyright and other legal matters were resolved prior to Krishnamurti's death in 1986, while the remainders were settled shortly after he died. Per the legal settlements, certain Krishnamurti-related materials were deemed property of his erstwhile close friend, associate, and business manager D. Rajagopal or of entities affiliated with him. Other material remained part of the library collections in the Huntington Library at San Marino, California, where it had been donated by D. Rajagopal in the 1960s and 1970s; Lilliefelt 1995. Related report by a Krishnamurti Foundation trustee. [As far as can be ascertained the pertinent litigation is described in a neutral manner in this report].) Among other activities, the Foundations have continued, after his death, to publish new titles consisting of Krishnamurti's talks and writings, or new editions of older titles, in a variety of formats and media; a notable effort is the freely available online resource J. Krishnamurti Online.

Availability

As of 31 December 2010, according to one source, Krishnamurti-related materials numbered "2,412 works in 4,580 publications in 53 languages and 46,822 library holdings", (Note: WorldCat Identities c. 2010; VIAF 2011, § "Publication Statistics: Identifiers". As of April 2011, the Virtual International Authority File (VIAF) in its entry about Krishnamurti had identified "515 unique ISBNs" worldwide. At the time, Krishnamurti was variously labeled in library, bibliographical, reference, and trade sources as an "Eastern philosopher", "Theosophist", "Eastern mystic" (or just "Mystic"), "Guru", "Spiritual" (or "Religious") "leader", "teacher" or "philosopher", etc. His works were classified accordingly; it was not unusual for the same work to be found under the categories "Mysticism", "Psychology", "Hinduism", "Eastern religions", "Philosophy", "Education", or "Self-help", sometimes in the listings of the same source. Since the publication of the earliest works and as of 2011 his works have been classified either by his given name (Krishnamurti) or by his family name (Jiddu, or in a few cases variations such as Jeddu, usually pre-1933); in general, he was often referred to by the given name only.) while a trade concern stated, "His teachings of more than 20,000,000 words are published in more than 75 books, 600 videos and 1200 audios. Over 4,000,000 copies of books have been sold in twenty-two languages." Around the same time, Krishnamurti works in a variety of media were widely available through online and traditional retailers worldwide, in several different formats. (Note: For example, a "basic search" undertaken 2010-11-22 for "Krishnamurti J" in the US division of Amazon.com, returned over 2,000 results including dozens of book titles in print, e-book and audiobook format, but also items such as reproductions of the photograph that illustrates this page. The majority of the results were electronically downloadable MP3-formatted renditions of his public talks and discussions. [amazon.com website searched and browsed through a US-based computer utilizing a US-based Internet service provider].)

== Listing of works ==
=== Works in print ===
==== Krishnamurti on Krishnamurti ====
Krishnamurti rarely wrote (or spoke in public) about himself. In the following, he again usually refers to himself in third-person as noted above. However these works, being published diaries, are largely autobiographical.

- Krishnamurti's Notebook (1976). Published journal that Krishnamurti kept between June 1961 and March 1962. With the publication of this book, the general public had access to first-hand descriptions of the process, a strange condition that started in the 1920s and intermittently affected Krishnamurti throughout his life. Also contains numerous (explicit and implicit) references to a state of consciousness Krishnamurti often called the otherness, among other designations. (Note: [Emphasis added]. Jiddu Krishnamurti § Life-altering experiences.)
- Krishnamurti's Journal (1982). A personal journal, that he started in 1973 and kept intermittently until 1975. Now published as The Beauty of Life - Krishnamurti's Journal.
- Krishnamurti to Himself: his last journal (1987). Transcribed from audiotape recordings made at his home in the Ojai Valley between February 1983 and March 1984. Mary Lutyens, editor. M. Lutyens edited several of his books.

==== Pre-1933 works ====
These works by Krishnamurti cover the years 1910 to 1933, which include his involvement with the Theosophical Society and with the various incarnations of the Order of the Star.

- At the Feet of the Master (1910). The author of this book may also be listed or co-listed (in different editions) as Alcyone, a pseudonym of Krishnamurti. However the identity of the author of works originally listed as authored by so-called Alcyone has been the subject of debate. Regardless of the extent of Krishnamurti's actual involvement, these works are considered Theosophical literature. (Note: Alcyone 1910. The author of this first, and of several other early works was listed as Alcyone, a pseudonym assigned to Krishnamurti by Charles Webster Leadbeater. [In later editions of early works "Jiddu Krishnamurti" may be co-listed, or solely listed, as author]; M. Lutyens 1975, p. 44; Williams 2004, pp. 24–29 and related notes 93–100 in pp. 476–478 [in "Notes"]. There has been considerable skepticism among Krishnamurti's biographers and others about Krishnamurti's true role in the production of works originally published as authored or co-authored by so-called Alcyone; M. Lutyens 1975, "Chapter 3: The Discovery" pp. 20–28. Leadbeater, an influential Theosophist, was the person who "discovered" Krishnamurti as the possible "vehicle" for the new Messiah, and was in charge of preparing him for his "mission".)
- Education as Service (1912). Another Alcyone book whose authorship has been questioned. (Note: Williams 2004, p. 476 [in "Notes": no. 93].)
- "Lecture delivered at Benares on December 28th, 1921" (September 1922). A talk by Krishnamurti at the 1921 Theosophical Society Convention, which took place at Benares. Published in the Herald of the Star, then official bulletin of the Order of the Star in the East (a precursor organization of the Order of the Star). (Note: [Note weblink in reference is not at official Krishnamurti or Theosophical Society website. Link-specific content verified against original at New York Public Library Main Branch: "Herald of the star". Classic Catalog. New York Public Library. YBEA (Herald of the star) [call no.] Archived from the original on 2022-07-19.]; M. Lutyens 1975, p. 134. M. Lutyens states the subject of this talk as being "Theosophy and Internationalism". It begins, "As it is December 28th, you are all probably expecting something miraculous, ..." Krishnamurti is referring to an older incident in this quote which reputedly happened on the same date and place ten years earlier, at a Theosophical function Krishnamurti was officiating (M. Lutyens 1975, pp. 54–55).)
- The Immortal Friend (1928). Poetry collection. Krishnamurti composed over 60 poems, published in the official bulletins of the Order of the Star, book collections of his poetry, and elsewhere. (Note: M. Lutyens 1975, pp. 239, 298 [in "Chronology": (part of entry for) January 1923]. "His first poem published in Herald."; Williams 2004, p. 508 [in "Notes": no. 58].)
- The pool of wisdom (1928).
- Life in Freedom (1928). Compiled from so-called campfire addresses given in Benares, Ojai, and Ommen, during the 1928 Star Camps. These were annual multi-day gatherings of members of the Order of the Star.
- "The Dissolution of the Order of the Star: A Statement by J. Krishnamurti" (September 1929). The speech by which Krishnamurti dissolved the Order of the Star. Originally delivered 3 August 1929 during the Ommen Star Camp, it was printed in its entirety in the Order's official magazine, the International Star Bulletin.
  - The Dissolution of the Order of the Star: A Statement (1929). Krishnamurti's speech, listed above, was included in this special 14-page pamphlet published by the Star Publishing Trust. On the cover are the Order's founding and dissolution dates and places: "January 11, 1911 Benares Ommen August 3, 1929".
- "India's aspirations" (7 June 1930). Article in London's current affairs magazine The Nation and Atheneum with byline "by J. Krishnamurti; (The 'New World Teacher')". Pre-Indian independence, Krishnamurti applies his message to the "Indian problem" asserting, "The true enemy of freedom is dead tradition". (Note: J. Krishnamurti 1930. "The true enemy of freedom is dead tradition; living at second hand; the enslavement of the life to-day to the worn-out formulas of a past age. ... This is the true Indian problem. ... This is a hard lesson and, perhaps, an unwelcome one.") The article was reprinted from the December 1929 issue of the International Star Bulletin.
- The Song of Life (1931). Poetry. The final collection of poems Krishnamurti published.
- Early Writings Series (1969–1972). Seven-volume series of early works by J. Krishnamurti. (Note: The volumes consist of offprints from Chetana magazine (Mumbai, India: Chetana Publishing). These originally appeared in Chetana in the 1960s and early 1970s, and were collected in seven volumes, published between 1969 and 1972. The whole series was reissued in 1978.) The series compiles material from 1927 to 1933, originally in bulletins, journals and pamphlets published by the Star Publishing Trust.
- From Darkness to Light (1980). Poetry, prose, and parables originally published between 1923 and 1931. Also subtitled "The Collected Works of Krishnamurti Volume One", this is completely different from the Collected Works Volume 1 listed below.

==== Post-1933 works ====
- War abolished: One way to permanent peace (1943). Contains talks by Krishnamurti in Ojai and Pennsylvania during 1940. These were edited into chapter-based layout by "L.L.W." (L.L.Woolacott) and published as the second volume in Sydney-based Currawong Publishing's Unpopular Pamphlets series. (Note: L.L.W. (1943). Foreword. War abolished: one way to permanent peace. By J. Krishnamurti. L.L.W. (ed.). Unpopular Pamphlets Series. Vol. 2. Sydney: Currawong. p. [6 (not numbered)]. OCLC 17017442. "[Krishnamurti] has revealed himself as a provocative thinker, with all the moral bravery necessary to promulgate unpopular opinions."; Masey 1943. Review (positive).) Currawong was known as a publisher or licensee of anti-war pamphlets and books from a wide variety of authors, as well as of other works of political nature. During World War II Krishnamurti's stance was often construed as pacifism or subversion during a time of patriotic fervor, and for a time he came under surveillance by the FBI in the United States. (Note: Vernon 2001, p. 209.)
- Authentic report of sixteen talks given in 1945 & 1946 (1947). Publication of two series of talks at Ojai. With short preface by Krishnamurti. In these talks and others from 1944 Krishnamurti introduced concepts that eventually became regular aspects of his message.
- A new approach to living, The way of living, The way of peace (c. 1948). 16-page pamphlet contains transcripts of three talks broadcast from All India Radio at Madras and Bombay between 16 October 1947 and 3 April 1948, during a period of turmoil and change in India.
- The First and Last Freedom (1954). Includes a comprehensive foreword by Aldous Huxley.
- Commentaries on Living Series (1956–1960). A three-volume series subtitled "From the notebooks of J. Krishnamurti". The series editor was Rajagopal Desikacharya, at the time a close associate and friend of Krishnamurti. (Note: Methorst 2003, "Chapter 12". D. Rajagopal ("Raja", 1900–1993), had moved in Krishnamurti's circle since early youth. After the death of Krishnamurti's brother Nitya in 1925, he replaced him as Krishnamurti's frequent travel companion and aide, and as official of the SPT. Following the dissolution of the Order of the Star, and until the late 1960s, he served as the head or co-head of a number of successive corporations and trusts, chartered to publish Krishnamurti's talks, discussions and other writings, and also to organize and finance his itinerary.)
  - Series One (1956).
  - Series Two (1958).
  - Series Three (1960).
- This Matter of Culture (1964). Rajagopal Desikacharya, editor.
  - Think on these Things (1970). Republication of This Matter of Culture with new title and publisher. (Note: McGhee 2000, § "Think on These Things" pp. 1035–1038. Comprehensive review (positive).)
- Freedom from the Known (1969). Mary Lutyens, editor.
- The Only Revolution (1970). Mary Lutyens, editor. (Note: Zaehner 1970. The work was reviewed by Robert Charles Zaehner in The Times Literary Supplement, in juxtaposition with The Politics of Ecstasy, a contemporary work by Timothy Leary (London: MacGibbon & Kee 1970 ed., ISBN 978-0-261-63175-5). Zaehner is generally approving of Krishnamurti, though he is not overwhelmed by his message; he is uniformly negative towards Leary and his book, using Krishnamurti – in character and selected quotes – as examples to support his opinion.)
- The Urgency of Change (1970). Mary Lutyens, editor. Book-length question and answer session, with questions posed by Alain Naude, Krishnamurti's personal secretary in the 1960s.
  - Second Penguin Krishnamurti Reader (1973). This book compiles The Only Revolution and the Urgency of Change. Krishnamurti biographer Christine V. Williams was one of those who credited this mass market two-volume Penguin Reader series with introducing Krishnamurti and his work to a truly wide audience, and with helping to establish his reputation as a philosopher of note both with the general public and within intellectual circles. The first volume had been published in 1970. (Note: Williams 2004, p. 386.)
- The Impossible Question (1972).
- You Are the World (1972). Subtitled, "Authentic Reports of Talks and Discussions in American Universities" – at Brandeis University, University of California (Berkeley and Santa Cruz), and Stanford University in 1968 and 1969.
- The Awakening of Intelligence (1973). Cornelia and George Wingfield Digby, editors. (Note: Keel 1975. The work received an unusual mini-review in a journal on general semantics. The reviewer "rearranged Krishnamurti's words into something that is neither poem nor review: a name pops up – 'book notery.'" [Based on the Krishnamurti statement, "Seeing destroys all barriers."])
- Beyond Violence (1973). Consists of two series of talks (in Santa Monica, California, and London) and a single talk in Rome, Italy. All talks delivered during 1970.
- Meditations (1979). Compilation of quotes and writings on meditation. Evelyne Blau, editor.
- The Network of Thought (1982). Consists of talks at Saanen and Amsterdam, in July and September 1981. A commentator described this work: "Krishnamurti compares bad education with computer programming, in which minds are turned into biological and emotional machines to fit into preconceived patterns, or mental networks, for controlling social and political behavior. Self-observation without thought is the paradoxical way to break out of these networks." (Note: McGhee 2000, pp. 1034–1035.)
- The Flame of Attention (1984).
- The Way of Intelligence (1985).
- Last Talks at Saanen, 1985 (1987). Krishnamurti spoke at annual meetings at Saanen, Switzerland, between 1961 and 1985. Krishnamurti biographer Pupul Jayakar wrote that these meetings became a focus for "serious ... people concerned with the enormous challenges to humankind". (Note: Jayakar 1986, pp. 282–283.)
- The Future Is Now: Last Talks in India (1988). Includes edited versions of Krishnamurti's last public talks, and also of discussions with Hindu and Buddhist scholars.
- Washington D.C. 1985 Talks (1988). Contains two talks delivered April 1985, his first ever in Washington, D.C., that are considered among the best (and best received) addresses by Krishnamurti who was then 90 years old. (Note: Zimbalist, Mary (1988b). Foreword. Washington D.C. 1985 talks. By J. Krishnamurti. Bramdean: Krishnamurti Foundation Trust. p. 7. ISBN 978-90-6271-771-2. JKO 288. Archived from the original on 2012-03-03. Close Krishnamurti associate and aide Mary Zimbalist wrote that the hall was "filled with a varied, seriously-interested audience and as Krishnamurti spoke there seemed an intangible response, a quality in which the listeners joined in his communication."; M. Lutyens 2003b, "Chapter 8: First Talks in Washington" pp. 90–100; Williams 2004, p. 459.) Both talks also included in the book Total Freedom: The Essential Krishnamurti and were published in video, see below.
- Total Freedom: The Essential Krishnamurti (1996). Introduction to Krishnamurti and selections from the breadth of his works, Mary Cadogan, Alan Kishbaugh, Mark Lee, and Ray McCoy editors.
- Krishnamurti: Reflections on the Self (1997). Raymond Martin, editor.
- To Be Human (2000). David Skitt, editor.
- The First Step is the Last Step (2004). From the title page: "Re-edited version of the talks first published in 1971 under the title Krishnamurti in India, 1970–71".
- Facing a World in Crisis (2005). David Skitt, editor.

==== Works on education ====
Proper education was a major, lifelong concern of Krishnamurti. He and his associates established a number of schools during his lifetime, (Note: JKO & [b]; McGhee 2000, p. 1034. "Krishnamurti ... came to realize that all problems can be reduced – in origin, formulation, and resolution – to the problem of education.") in an effort to apply his holistic educational philosophy. (Note: Giddu 1998, p. 64. Krishnamurti enumerated the following as his educational aims: 1. Global outlook – A vision of the whole as distinct from the part; there should never be a sectarian outlook, but always a holistic outlook free from all prejudice. 2. Concern for humanity and the environment – Humanity is part of nature, and if nature is not cared for, it will boomerang on humankind. Only the right education, and deep affection between people everywhere, will resolve our many problems including the environmental challenges. 3. Religious spirit, which includes the scientific temper – The religious mind is alone, not lonely. It is in communion with people and nature. [Emphasis added. Krishnamurti's enumeration non-verbatim, edited for brevity. G. Narayan was Krishnamurti's nephew and was involved in his educational projects for many years].) Although he was not involved in the daily running of the schools, Krishnamurti visited often, engaging teachers and students in talks and discussions. Starting in the 1970s, he also addressed a number of open Letters to Schools, which were later compiled in book form. (Note: M. Lutyens 2003c, p. 156. The letters were dictated by Krishnamurti, starting in 1978.)

- Education and the Significance of Life (1953). One of several books containing Krishnamurti's educational ideas and concerns. This was the first Krishnamurti book to be published by a commercial publisher. (Note: Williams 2004, p. 314; Sloss 1993, p. 236. According to Sloss, the book was edited (anonymously) by D. Rajagopal; Rogers 1971. Almost two decades after its original publication, the work received a comprehensive review in an academic journal. "A decade before John Holt and Herbert Kohl, a relatively obscure Indian philosopher, Jiddu Krishnamurti, was talking about 'why children fail' and 'the open classroom.'")
- Krishnamurti on Education (1974). Talks and discussions with students and teachers of the Krishnamurti Foundation India-affiliated Rishi Valley and Rajghat Besant schools.
- Beginnings of Learning (1975). Edited transcripts of Krishnamurti's discussions on education with students and staff at the Krishnamurti Foundation Trust (UK)-affiliated Brockwood Park School. (Note: Bagby 1975. Review. Bagby thinks readers will find these discussions "hard going", but states that the book offers "glimpses of the warm humanity which tempers the austerity of Krishnamurti's mind.")
- "Intent of the Krishnamurti Schools" (1984). Statement by Krishnamurti distributed during his talks and discussions at Ojai, California, in 1984. (Note: Grohe 1991, "[Chapter 3 (not numbered):] Ojai".) Later published in the Journal of the Krishnamurti Schools, an in-print and online publication of the Krishnamurti Foundation India. The Journal's articles – primarily authored by teachers at Krishnamurti Schools around the world – "broadly cover the areas of philosophy and practice in education."
- The whole movement of life is learning: J. Krishnamurti's letters to his schools (2007). Contains material that was originally published as Letters to Schools in two volumes (1981 and 1985). In addition, seventeen previously unpublished letters are included. Ray McCoy, editor.

==== Dialogues ====
The following works are composed of Krishnamurti discussions with individuals or small groups, listed (in subheading) by the main counterpart's last name. In these often very informal discussions, Krishnamurti was able to expand on his message in a way not conducive to the more constrained talk format. He also used discussions to elaborate on subjects only minimally, or not at all, found elsewhere. (Note: Jayakar 1986, p. 492. On his discussions with associates: "Some of the most intense insights have been revealed at these sessions."; Alev 1997. Interview with David Bohm biographer F. David Peat. "With Krishnamurti the dialogues they had went very, very deep.")

Allan W. Anderson

- A Wholly Different Way of Living (1991). A series of 18 conversations between Krishnamurti and Allan W. Anderson, Professor of Religious Studies at San Diego State University that took place in February 1974. Also available in audio and video formats, see section in this page.

David Bohm

Physicist David Bohm and Krishnamurti met in the early 1960s, and established a relationship that lasted until Krishnamurti's death. They examined their common concerns in a number of discussions; several have been published, in a variety of formats. (Note: Peat 1997, pp. 192–197, 226–231; "Chapter 15: Dialogue and Disorder" pp. 282–302; "Afterword" pp. 323–330. According to Peat, the editing into book form of some of these discussions, brought "tensions" regarding Bohm "to a head", among some Krishnamurti associates who, in Peat's view, "resented their closeness".)

- Truth and Actuality: Part 1 (1977). Discussions at Brockwood Park, England, during May 1975. Cornelia and George Wingfield Digby, editors.
- The Ending of Time (1985). Edited versions of 13 conversations that took place in Ojai, California and Brockwood Park, England, during 1980. Also available in various video and audio formats. (Note: M. Lutyens 2003b, p. 18. These discussions were edited anonymously into book form by Mary Cadogan, a long-time Krishnamurti associate in England.)
- The Future of Humanity (1986). With foreword by David Bohm. These discussions, from June 1983, are also available on video.
- Limits of Thought (1999). Seven discussions from 1975, edited by Ray McCoy. In preface, Bohm presents "an introduction to Krishnamurti's work."

David Bohm and David Shainberg

- The Wholeness of Life: Part I (1978). Contains an abridgement of discussions between Krishnamurti, physicist David Bohm, and psychiatrist David Shainberg, held in 1976. Available on video as The Transformation of Man, see Audio and video resources below.
  - The Transformation of Man (2004). Republication of The Wholeness of Life with different main title and publisher.

Fellows of the Los Alamos National Laboratory

- Krishnamurti at Los Alamos 1984 (1984). "In March 1984, Krishnamurti took part in a symposium at the National Laboratory Research Center at Los Alamos, New Mexico, on the subject of creativity in science. Also released on video. Included in the published symposium proceedings.

Pupul Jayakar, Mary Lutyens, Mary Zimbalist and Scott H. Forbes, etc.

Krishnamurti engaged in a number of public and private discussions with longtime close friend and associate, ~~and official biographer~~ Pupul Jayakar (Note: Jayakar 1986, p. xi [in "Preface"].) over several decades.

Krishnamurti also engaged in a number of private discussions on his early age with Emily Lutyens, mother of Mary Lutyens, and in private and public discussions with Mary herself, including Scott H. Forbes - See Audio and video resources below.

He only asked two people to write about him: Mary Lutyens, who in fact was his official biographer. He wanted her to record the whole of his life. He also wanted Mary Taylor- Zimbalist to write about what it was like to be with him, which she does using, as her source material, the daily dairies she kept for the 22 years she was with him. This work can also be found online after her initial but unfinished attempt to write a book, about what it was like to be with Krishnamurti. From this work, we know more about the daily life of Krishnamurti than any other famous person alive.

- Exploration into Insight (1991). Discussions with Jayakar and several others in India. When in India, Krishnamurti regularly held daily informal discussions with friends and associates that covered wide ranges of subjects; the discussions often explored and challenged his message in depth, a situation that stimulated him, according to another biographer. (Note: M. Lutyens 2003c, p. 176. "K [Krishnamurti] was stimulated by these discussions in India. ... It was also the Indian way to question everything that was said. This K thoroughly approved of, since faith, unquestioningly accepting the words of another, was to him an insurmountable barrier to the discovery of truth through self-understanding." However she also calls some of the arguments in these discussions as overly intellectual, in her opinion excluding the "intuitive leaps" required for understanding; Jayakar 1986 contains numerous references to these discussions in India, including detailed presentations of several, and summations of others.)
- Fire in the Mind (1995). More discussions with Jayakar and others, held from the late 1960s to the mid-1980s, recorded and edited by Jayakar.

Walpola Rahula, et al.

- Can Humanity Change?: Part One (2003). Subtitled "J. Krishnamurti in dialogue with Buddhists", David Skitt, editor. Five discussions from the late 1970s with Buddhist scholar Walpola Rahula and Zen teacher Irmgard Schloegl. Other participants include physicist David Bohm, and author and scientist Phiroz Mehta.

Various counterparts: Iris Murdoch, Jonas Salk, etc.

- Questioning Krishnamurti (1996). Discussions and question-and-answer sessions with a variety of participants. Includes separate sessions with medical researcher Jonas Salk, writer and philosopher Iris Murdoch, physicist David Bohm, Buddhist scholar Walpola Rahula, associate Pupul Jayakar, journalist Bernard Levin, author and Professor of Religion Huston Smith, Tibetan Buddhism teacher Chogyam Trungpa Rinpoche, and others.

==== "Collected Works" series ====
This series consists of previously published talks, discussions, question and answer sessions, and other writings, covering the period 1933–1967. Originally published as a stand-alone series of 17 volumes, it has become part of the much larger Complete Works of J. Krishnamurti: 1910–1986. As of 2010, this undertaking – also referred to as the Complete Teachings Project – was a continuing collaborative effort by the Krishnamurti Foundations; the objective being a cohesively edited collection of the entire body of Krishnamurti's works. It is estimated that the Complete Works would run to over 50 volumes of print media, and will be released in other formats, including online.

- Volume 1 (1933–1934): The Art of Listening (1991).
- Volume 2 (1934–1935): What Is the Right Action? (1991).
- Volume 3 (1936–1944): The Mirror of Relationship (1991).
- Volume 4 (1945–1948): The Observer Is the Observed (1991).
- Volume 5 (1948–1949): Choiceless Awareness (1991).
- Volume 6 (1949–1952): The Origin of Conflict (1991).
- Volume 7 (1952–1953): Tradition and Creativity (1991).
- Volume 8 (1953–1955): What Are You seeking? (1991).
- Volume 9 (1955–1956): The Answer is in the Problem (1991).
- Volume 10 (1956–1957): A Light to Yourself (1991).
- Volume 11 (1958–1960): Crisis in Consciousness (1991).
- Volume 12 (1961): There is No Thinker, Only Thought (1991).
- Volume 13 (1962–1963): A Psychological Revolution (1992).
- Volume 14 (1963–1964): The New Mind (1992).
- Volume 15 (1964–1965): The Dignity of Living (1992).
- Volume 16 (1965–1966): The Beauty of Death (1992).
- Volume 17 (1966–1967): Perennial Questions (1992).

=== Audio and video resources ===
- "Film Clips: New York 1928, Ojai 1930" (1928/1930). Film clips of young Krishnamurti from uncredited original sources. First part [New York City 1928 according to the description] apparently part of newsreel. In the second part [described as having been filmed in Ojai, California, in 1930], Krishnamurti reiterates the themes and language of the speech he gave dissolving the Order of the Star. Unofficial release.
- The Real Revolution (1966). The first full-length talks of Krishnamurti recorded on video, from a series of talks and discussions in Ojai in 1966. These were edited into 30-minute programs for broadcast by non-commercial US television station WNDT.
- True Revolution (1969). Part of a series of talks at the University of California, Berkeley in February 1969, this talk was recorded on the 6th, and was released (in limited distribution) as a spoken word album by Pacifica Radio.
- A Wholly Different Way of Living (1974). A series of 18 conversations between Krishnamurti and Allan W. Anderson, Professor of Religious Studies at San Diego State University, originally recorded on audio and video tape in 1974. Also published in book form.
- The Transformation of Man (1976). Two conversations with physicist David Bohm and psychiatrist David Shainberg videotaped in 1976. Also published as part of the book The Wholeness of Life.
- The Ending of Time (1980). Published in a variety of audio and video formats, these eight discussions between physicist David Bohm and Krishnamurti took place in 1980, and were part of the raw material for the book with the same title.
- The Nature of Love (1982). Alternately titled Krishnamurti: On the Nature of Love. Videocassette recording, from a 1982 talk at Ojai, California.
- "Third Discussion with students at Rishi Valley, 1984" (1984). One of a series of discussions at the Rishi Valley School in 1984. In five parts. First two parts concern meditation, concentration, and attention. In the remaining parts Krishnamurti discusses conformity, corruption, and finding one's place in the world.
- Knowledge is conditioning (1984). First of three conversations videotaped between Krishnamurti and Mary Zimbalist, at Brockwood Park, UK.
- Thought and time are the cause of fear (1984) Second of three conversations videotaped between Krishnamurti and Mary Zimbalist, at Brockwood Park, UK.
- Religion is an inquiry (1984) Third of three conversations videotaped between Krishnamurti, Mary Zimbalist, and Ray McCoy, at Brockwood Park, UK.
- Why don't you listen? (1985). First of two small group discussions videotaped between Krishnamurti, Mary Zimbalist and Scott Forbes, at Brockwood Park, UK.
- Will Brockwood be a place where people come to listen to something very deep? (1985). Second of two small group discussions videotaped between Krishnamurti, Mary Zimbalist and Scott Forbes, at Brockwood Park, UK.
- Washington Talks (1985). Also published in book form, see Washington D.C 1985 Talks.
- "Third Public Talk at Madras, 4 January 1986" (1986). Krishnamurti's last public talk – he died less than two months later. Uncredited original source. An edited transcript was published in the book The Future is Now. Unofficial release.

=== Other media ===
- "The Core of the Teachings" (c. 1980). Webpage contains a pivotal Krishnamurti statement, also published in print. He broadly outlines and reaffirms his message, asserting in the opening sentence its unbroken continuity since the Dissolution of the Order of the Star. Krishnamurti originally composed it 21 October 1980, in response to a question by Mary Lutyens, who was at the time writing the second volume of his biography. (Note: M. Lutyens 2003a, pp. 204–205. "I had wanted a short statement but realized that as K [Krishnamurti] had said himself, his teaching could not be put in a few words." The statement was later minimally edited by him. This source includes the original draft; the reference weblink reflects the edits.)
- The Krishnamurti Text Collection CD-ROM (1991). This Microsoft Windows-compatible CD-ROM includes the text collection of all of Krishnamurti's published works from 1933 to 1986, "whether in book, audio, or video form". It also includes, in the 1999 version, "70 additional transcripts not featured in previous versions." (Note: KFT c. 2011. [Note printing of the CD-ROM content (version 1.3) is restricted].)

== See also ==
- List of works about Jiddu Krishnamurti

== Notes and sources ==
=== Sources for notes ===
Listed alphabetically by author or editor, else by title of work. Sub listed by date in ascending order.

- "About the Journal". Journal of the Krishnamurti Schools. Chennai: Krishnamurti Foundation India. OCLC 54980814. Archived from the original on 2009-06-05.
- Alev, Simeon (1997). "Look for Truth No Matter Where It Takes You". What is Enlightenment Magazine (11 [Spring–Summer 1997]). Interview with F. David Peat. Lenox, Massachusetts. ISSN 1080-3432. OCLC 60627858. Archived from the original on 2010-06-21.
- Bagby, Jeanne S. (1 June 1975). "Beginnings of learning (Book Review)". Library Journal. 100 (11): 1133. ISSN 0360-3113.
- "Foundations". J. Krishnamurti Online. Krishnamurti Foundations.
- Giddu, Narayan (1998). Narsipur, Chandramouli (ed.). As the river joins the ocean: reflections about J. Krishnamurti. Delhi: Book Faith India. ISBN 978-81-7303-178-6.
- Grohe, Friedrich (1991). The beauty of the mountain: memories of Krishnamurti. Bramdean: Krishnamurti Foundation Trust. OCLC 38028234.
- Jayakar, Pupul (1986). Krishnamurti: a biography (1st ed.). San Francisco: Harper & Row. ISBN 978-0-06-250401-2.
- Jiddu, Krishnamurti (December 1929). "The True Enemy of Freedom: A View of India's Spiritual Aspirations". International Star Bulletin. [3] (5 [issues renumbered starting August 1929, volume not numbered in original]). Eerde, Ommen: Star Publishing Trust: 5–6. OCLC 34693176.
- Jiddu, Krishnamurti (1971b). Krishnamurti in India, 1970-71: authentic reports of talks. New Delhi: Krishnamurti Foundation India. OCLC 726435.
- Jiddu, Krishnamurti (1981b). Letters to Schools Volume One. Bramdean: Krishnamurti Foundation Trust. ISBN 978-90-6271-758-3. JKO 259. Archived from the original on 2012-03-17.
- Jiddu, Krishnamurti (15 May 1982). "Fifth public talk at Ojai". J.Krishnamurti Online. Krishnamurti Foundations. JKO OJ82T5. Archived from the original on 2012-03-17.
- Keel, John (1975). "The Awakening of the [sic] Intelligence by J. Krishnamurti (Book Review)". ETC: A Review of General Semantics. 32. Fort Worth, Texas: Institute of General Semantics: 433. ISSN 0014-164X. [Published book title omits second occurrence of "the"].
- "Krishnamurti Foundation Trust CD ROM". kfoundation.org.uk. Bramdean: Krishnamurti Foundation Trust. Archived from the original on 2010-12-22.
- Lilliefelt, Erna (1995). KFA history: report on the formation of the Krishnamurti Foundation of America and the lawsuits which took place between 1968 and 1986 to recover assets for Krishnamurti's work. Ojai, California: Krishnamurti Publications of America. ISBN 978-1-888004-06-9.
- Lutyens, Mary (1975). Krishnamurti: the years of awakening (1st US ed.). New York: Farrar Straus and Giroux. ISBN 978-0-374-18222-9.
- Years of Fulfillment (1st KFT ed.). Bramdean: Krishnamurti Foundation Trust. 2003a [1983]. ISBN 978-0900506208.
- —— (2003b) [originally published 1988. London: John Murray]. Krishnamurti: the open door (1st KFT ed.). Bramdean: Krishnamurti Foundation Trust. ISBN 978-0-900506-21-5. Google Books [web preview publisher]. Archived from the original on 2013-10-02.
- —— (2003c) [originally published 1990. London: John Murray]. The life and death of Krishnamurti (1st UK ed.). Bramdean: Krishnamurti Foundation Trust. ISBN 978-0719547492. Google Books [web preview publisher].
- Masey, Edward (June 1943). "Review: Unpopular Pamphlets". The Australian Quarterly. 15 (2). Camperdown, New South Wales: Australian Institute of Policy & Science: 115–116. doi:10.2307/20631114. ISSN 0005-0091. JSTOR 20631114.
- McGhee, Richard D (2000). "Jiddu Krishnamurti". World Philosophers and Their Works. Vol. II. Pasadena, California: Salem Press. pp. 1032–1039. ISBN 978-0-89356-880-1.
- Methorst, Henri (2003). Krishnamurti: a spiritual revolutionary: reflections on his life and work. Ojai, California: Edwin House. ISBN 978-0-9649247-9-6.
- Peat, F. David (1997). Infinite potential: the life and times of David Bohm. Reading, Massachusetts: Addison–Wesley. ISBN 978-0-201-32820-2. Google Books [web preview publisher].
- Rogers, Donald J. (October 1971). "In Review". The Elementary School Journal. 71 (1). Chicago: University of Chicago Press: 47–50. doi:10.1086/460675. ISSN 0013-5984. JSTOR 1000491. [jstor full access].
- "Schools". J.Krishnamurti Online. Krishnamurti Foundations. Archived from the original on 2012-01-26.
- Sloss, Radha Rajagopal (1993) [originally published 1991. London: Bloomsbury Publishing]. Lives in the shadow with J. Krishnamurti (hardcover). Reading, Massachusetts: Addison–Wesley. ISBN 978-0-201-63211-8.
- "The Complete Works of J. Krishnamurti: 1910–1986" (PDF). Vasanta Vihar Newsletter (24 [March 2003]). Chennai: Krishnamurti Foundation India: 1. Archived from the original (PDF) on 2007-07-11.
- "The mission of the KFA". kfa.org. Ojai, California: Krishnamurti Foundation of America. 1969. Archived from the original on 2010-06-19.
- At the feet of the master: Krishnamurti J. (Jiddu) 1895–1986. San Francisco: University of California Libraries. 2008. Archive details page (Chicago: Rajput Press 1911 ed.). ISBN 9780524017753 – via The Internet Archive.
- Vernon, Roland (2001). Star in the east: Krishnamurti: the invention of a messiah. New York: Palgrave. ISBN 978-0-312-23825-4.
- "VIAF ID: 105950421". Virtual International Authority File. Online Computer Library Center (OCLC). 2011. Archived from the original on 2011-08-12.
- "Bowker's Author Biography: Krishnamurti, J". booksinprint.com ("Books in Print Professional"). New York: R. R. Bowker.(subscription required)
- "Krishnamurti, J. (Jiddu) 1895–1986". WorldCat Identities. Online Computer Library Center (OCLC). c. 2010.
- Williams, Christine V. (2004). Jiddu Krishnamurti: world philosopher (1895–1986): his life and thoughts. Delhi: Motilal Banarsidass. ISBN 978-81-208-2032-6. Google Books [web preview publisher]. Archived from the original on 2013-05-28.
- Zaehner, Robert Charles (12 March 1970). "Private and Psychedelic Genius". The Times Literary Supplement (3550). London: 274. ISSN 0307-661X.
