= Krishnamurti's Journal =

1982/2023 published diary of Jiddu Krishnamurti

- First US edition
- Author: Jiddu Krishnamurti
- Language: English
- Subject: Autobiography, philosophy
- Publisher: Gollancz (UK); Harper & Row (US); Watkins
- Publication date: 1982 (1st edition); 2023 (3rd revised full-text edition)
- Publication place: United Kingdom, United States
- Media type: Digital (e-book); Print (hardcover, paperback)
- Pages: 100 pp (1st edition); 208 pp (full-text edition)
- ISBN: 978-0-06-064841-1 (1st US edition); 978-1-78678-747-7 (full-text hardcover)
- Text: Krishnamurti's Journal at J. Krishnamurti Online
- Retitled The Beauty of Life in full-text edition; J. Krishnamurti Online has the 1st edition

Krishnamurti's Journal, republished as The Beauty of Life: Krishnamurti's Journal is a diary of 20th-century Indian philosopher Jiddu Krishnamurti (1895–1986). Originally published in print in 1982, it was republished under the new title in an extended edition in 2023. The diary, a handwritten journal that eschews the first person, is composed of entries dated in 1973, 1975 and (in the extended edition) 1981. The entries touch on favorite Krishnamurti topics like meditation, the dangerous effects of identification and of conditioned thinking, and the need for radical individual psychological reset. The diary is also known for poetic and nuanced descriptions of nature, and of nature's relationship with human consciousness. The published work is considered one of the very few books Krishnamurti wrote himself.

== About the work ==
Mary Lutyens, authorized biographer and longtime friend of Krishnamurti, writes in Foreword that in September 1973 he "suddenly started keeping a journal." Yet elsewhere she states that she had at the time suggested the journal to Krishnamurti. This is affirmed in contemporary notes by Mary Zimbalist, Krishnamurti's personal secretary and close associate; she writes that following Lutyens' suggestion Krishnamurti recounted a strange experience he reputedly had two weeks earlier, and agreed to start the journal. He began writing the next day, 14 September 1973, while at Brockwood Park in Hampshire.

Krishnamurti kept writing (in pencil) almost daily for a period of six weeks, during his stay at Brockwood Park and then while in Rome; he resumed the diary in April 1975 in California, committing the last entry there on 24 April at Malibu. These entries comprise the original edition of the published diary; however six years later Krishnamurti wrote additional entries. Zimbalist states he added to the journal in August 1981, when he was at Gstaad, Switzerland; he continued writing intermittently after he returned to Brockwood Park later the same month, with the final entry dated 28 August 1981. The additions, consisting of 13 new entries in 36 pages, were published in an extended edition 42 years later, in 2023.

Lutyens considers the published diary "one of two books K [Krishnamurti] wrote himself", as almost all known Krishnamurti texts are verbatim or edited transcripts of his talks and discussions, edited collections of his notes, and transcribed material he dictated in person or on audiotape. In print, the extended edition contains 59 entries most of which are between one and three pages long. Krishnamurti wrote in second or third person, referring to himself in the latter mode exclusively; in a few cases there is an anonymous interlocutor. A typical entry expounds on one or more of Krishnamurti's favorite themes through observations of nature, consciousness, and life that often flow seamlessly into each other.

A commentator stated that in this and other Krishnamurti diaries "depictions of nature are stunning in their fine detail, suggestive nuance, and variety. The observations about consciousness and about meditation are at one with the teachings as they were articulated to the public." He adds that in the Journal there are no overt references to the reputed experiences called the process and the otherness that permeate a previously published diary, Krishnamurti's Notebook (1976). Instead, in this diary "[t]he psychological observations closely parallel his statements from the public platform, although in a somewhat condensed and, if possible, a more immediate form." Lutyens believes this diary reveals "more about [Krishnamurti] personally than any of his other work" and offers, "only in his writings ... we have these lovely descriptions of nature."

== Publication history ==
The book was originally published in early 1982 by Gollancz in the UK and by Harper & Row in the US. The UK edition, in hardcover, has a portrait photograph of Krishnamurti on the jacket front; the US paperback a front cover portrait illustration of him. Without a table of contents, the short foreword by Lutyens is followed by the diary entries ordered and titled according to place and date. Copyright was held by the Krishnamurti Foundation Trust (KFT), a UK organization. A UK paperback version was published by Gollancz in August 1987.

In 2003 the Krishnamurti Foundation India (Chennai) published a "2nd revised edition", while another paperback was published by the KFT in 2004. Both are based on the original edition; they feature still life front covers and small author photographs on the back cover.

In January 2023 the work was republished in the extended "third, revised full-text edition" under the title The Beauty of Life (subtitled Krishnamurti's Journal). This edition includes the additional entries of 1981 and an edition-specific Introduction. Also, a table of contents listing in chronological order the places the diary was written; the front cover features a still life photograph. It was published in the UK and US by Watkins (an imprint of UK publisher Watkins Media) in print (hardcover) and digital media (e-book) versions, with copyright by the KFT. Previously, the diary entries of 1981 had originally been published in the KFT's Bulletin, a subscription-based periodical, between 1989 and 1991 as "reprint[s] from a journal".

As of September 2023 a free-to-read text version of the work's first edition was available at J. Krishnamurti Online (JKO), the official Jiddu Krishnamurti web-based repository.

=== Select editions ===
- Jiddu, Krishnamurti (1982). Krishnamurti's journal (hardcover). Foreword by Lutyens, Mary (1st UK ed.). London: Gollancz. 100 pp. ISBN 978-0575030404.
- —— (2004). Krishnamurti's journal (paperback). Foreword by Lutyens, Mary (KFT ed.). Bramdean: Krishnamurti Foundation Trust. 132 pp. ISBN 978-0900506239.
- —— (2023). The beauty of life: Krishnamurti's journal (Kindle e-book). Introduction by McCoy, Ray; Foreword by Lutyens, Mary (3rd, revised full-text ed.). London: Watkins. 1779 kB. ISBN 978-1-78678-753-8 – via Kindle Direct Publishing.

== Reception ==
A review in the Yoga Journal commended the book as "vividly illustrating his [Krishnamurti's] philosophy of meditation-in-action", and its author as an "observer of great compassion" whose sensitive descriptions are applied to the smallest detail. The work's frequent commentary on meditation and its perceived overall meditative quality, has been used as an example for certain types of meditation practice in school settings; such practices are considered an aid in reducing antisocial behavior and classroom tensions.

In an unrelated book review published in College English, the reviewer juxtaposes parts of the diary entry for 16 September 1973 with an excerpt from the reviewed academic work as examples of nature writing, and noting their differences asks, "why can't scholarly writing ... have the lyric beauty and deep personal concern of Krishnamurti's journal, instead of turning so often to ... ritualistic ideological narrative?"

The diary entry for 24 September 1973 is discussed in an anthology of contemplative literature as an illustration of Krishnamurti's ideas about direct observation, the perils of identifying with concepts and ideas, and the need for a radically new human consciousness.

The work has been cited in theoretical revisions of psychoanalysis, and has inspired published poetry. The first edition's reputed favorable public reception lead to the publication in 1987 of yet another Krishnamurti diary, Krishnamurti to Himself.

== See also ==
- Jiddu Krishnamurti bibliography
