= Rider (imprint) =

Publishing imprint of Ebury Publishing

- Parent company: Penguin Random House
- Founded: 1908
- Founder: William Rider & Son
- Country of origin: United Kingdom
- Headquarters location: London

Rider is a publishing imprint of Ebury Publishing, a Penguin Random House division, started by William Rider & Son in Britain in 1908 when it took over the occult publisher Phillip Wellby. The editorial director of the new list was Ralph Shirley and under his direction, they began to publish titles as varied as the Rider–Waite tarot deck and Bram Stoker's Dracula.

The current Rider motto is "New Ideas for New Ways of Living", and books and authors on the list reflect this. There are still books on the paranormal, with authors like Raymond Moody and Colin Fry; on astral projection with authors Sylvan Muldoon and Hereward Carrington; and spirituality, with books by the Dalai Lama and Jack Kornfield; and books on current and international affairs by authors as diverse as Nobel Prize-winners Archbishop Desmond Tutu and Shirin Ebadi.

== Bibliography ==
- Vera Stanley Alder:
  - The Finding of the Third Eye, 1938
  - The Initiation of the World, 1939
  - The Fifth Dimension, 1940
  - Wisdom in Practice, 1942
  - The Secret of the Atomic Age, 1958
  - From the Mundane to the Magnificent, 1979
- Paul Brunton
  - A Search in Secret India, 1934
  - The Secret Path, 1935
  - A Search in Secret Egypt, 1936
  - A Message from Arunachala, 1936
  - A Hermit in the Himalayas, 1936
  - The Quest of the Overself, 1937
  - Wisdom of the Overself, 1943
- Gerald Gardner, Witchcraft Today, 1954
- J. G. Carew Gibson, Communication with the Dead, 1930
- Tony Hogan, Born to Heal, 2002
- Karlfried Graf Dürckheim, The Japanese Cult of Tranquility, 1960
- Arthur Osborne, The Incredible Sai Baba, 1957
- Jonathan Yardley, States of Mind: A Personal Journey Through the Mid-Atlantic, 1993, ISBN 0-394-58911-4
- Ben Okri, Tales of Freedom, 2010, ISBN 978-1846041594
