= Dantu Muralikrishna =

Indian scientist, writer and singer

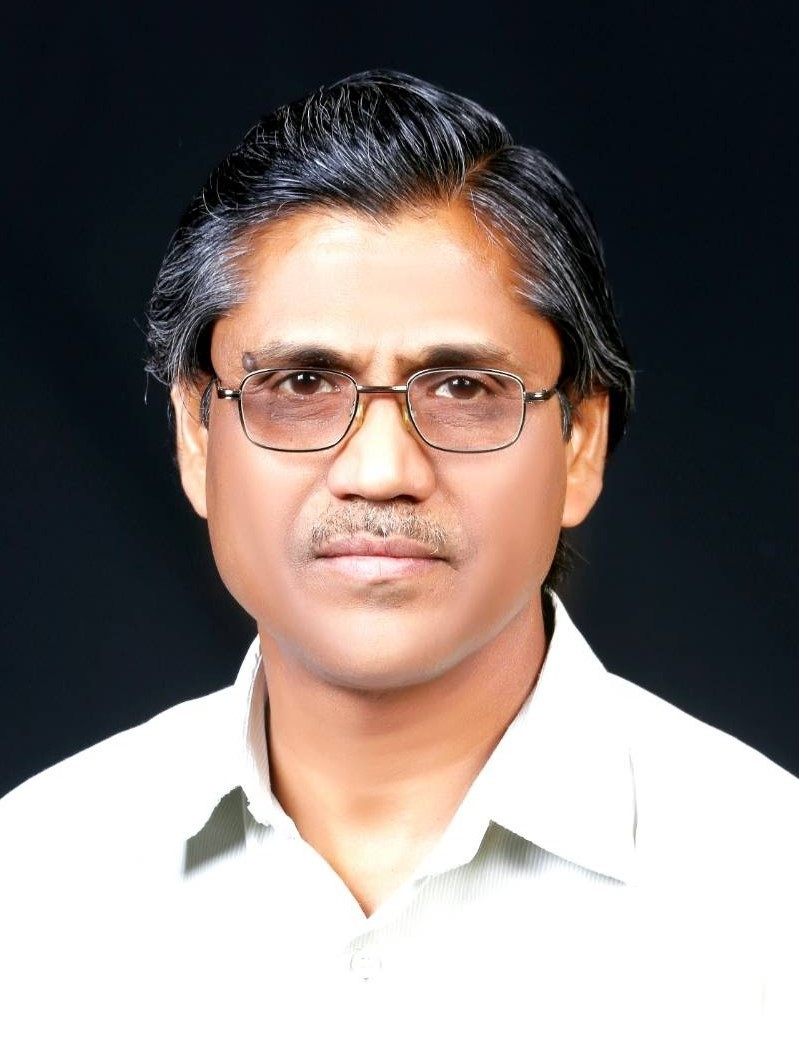
- Born: 15 May 1962 (age 64); Kunavaram, Khammam district, United Andhra Pradesh, India
- Education: MSc, PhD
- Alma mater: Kurukshetra University (MSc); Barkatullah University (PhD)
- Occupations: Scientist, writer, singer
- Notable work: Sambhavami Yuge Yuge (audio albums), Books and paper publications on Bhagavad-Gita
- Parents: Dantu Sitarama Dikshitulu (father); Dantu Surya Kumari (mother)
- Awards: Kala Ratna award 2025 by Chief minister of Andhra Pradesh N. Chandrababu Naidu; Vishist Sanskrit Sevavrati (2019) by Ministry of HRD, Government of India; 'International Icon Award' and 'Rashtriya Gaurav Samman 2021

Dantu Muralikrishna (born 1962) is an Indian scientist, writer and singer based in Bhopal, Madhya Pradesh, India.

He was honored with Vishist Sanskrit Sevavrati award by the Ministry of Human Resource Development, Government of India and Kala Ratna Award from Chief minister of Andhra Pradesh N. Chandrababu Naidu for his contribution on Bhagavad Gita.

He also received Sahitya Akademi Award 2024 by Government of Madhya Pradesh.

== Early life and education ==
Muralikrishna was born in 1962 at Kunavaram, Khammam district (now in East Godavari District) in Andhra Pradesh. His father was a teacher and his mother, a housewife.

He completed his bachelor's degree in Science from Government Arts College, Rajahmundry in Andhra Pradesh. Later he did his MSc in Chemistry from Kurukshetra University, Haryana. He holds a PhD from Barkatullah University, Bhopai.

== Career ==
Muralikrishna started his career from "Rainbow Inks & Varnish" and then changed to a pharma company, named "Cepham Laboratories Limited" at Haryana. Later he established his career in Lupin Limited with his services in various units of the organization.

He developed various cost effective and environmentally friendly processes for drug substances and he has number of patents and paper publications in journals on his scientific developments.

== Work on Bhagavad-Gita ==
Muralikrishna launched his audio albums on Bhagavad Gita, titled as "Sambhavami Yuge Yuge" in multiple languages. He is credited for conceptualization of various aspects from Bhagavad-Gita, useful for life management.

In his albums, he has composed and recited 108 Sanskrit verses based on Carnatic ragas and narrated the descriptions in Hindi, Telugu and in English in different audio albums in his own voice. His Sanskrit – Telugu and Sanskrit – Hindi audio albums of Bhagvad Gita were released by eminent Scholar, Vaddiparti Padmakar at Andhra Pradesh Bhavan, New Delhi which was organized by Delhi Telugu Sangham in association with Government of Andhra Pradesh on 16 June 2018.

His Sanskrit-English version of Audio Album of Bhagavad Gita was released by Nobel laureate Kailash Satyarthi, on 29 January 2020 at Kailash Satyarthi Children's Foundation, New Delhi. He authored books and published number of articles on management concepts in National and International Journals based on Bhagavad-Gita. He has made his albums and books publicly available for free of cost.

In August 2018, the Vice President of India, M. Venkaiah Naidu and the Governor of Madhya Pradesh, Anandiben Patel appreciated and honored him for his work on Bhagavad Gita.

Dr. D. Muralikrishna was one of the speakers in Bhagavad Gita Summit (from 10–14 December 2021) during Gita Jayanti at Dallas, Texas, US along with other notable personalities such as Swami Mukundananda Ji, Dr. Menas Kafatos, Mr. Shiv Khera, Kiran Bedi, Brahmacharini Gloria Arieira and others.

In Dec 2021, Chief Minister of Madhya Pradesh Sri Shivraj Singh Chouhan released the book "Master of Life Management" authored by Dr. Dantu Muralikrishna at Vidhan Sabha in CM's chamber in Bhopal. This book is based on the teachings of Shrimad Bhagwat Geeta.

In July 2024, Dr Sumer Singh Solanki, Honorable member of Parliament (Rajya Sabha) released the book "Jeevan Gita" of 630 pages in Hindi, authored by Dr Murali Krishna in New Delhi. The book is based on Bhagavad Gita with life management aspects useful for students, youth and for all.

== Published works ==
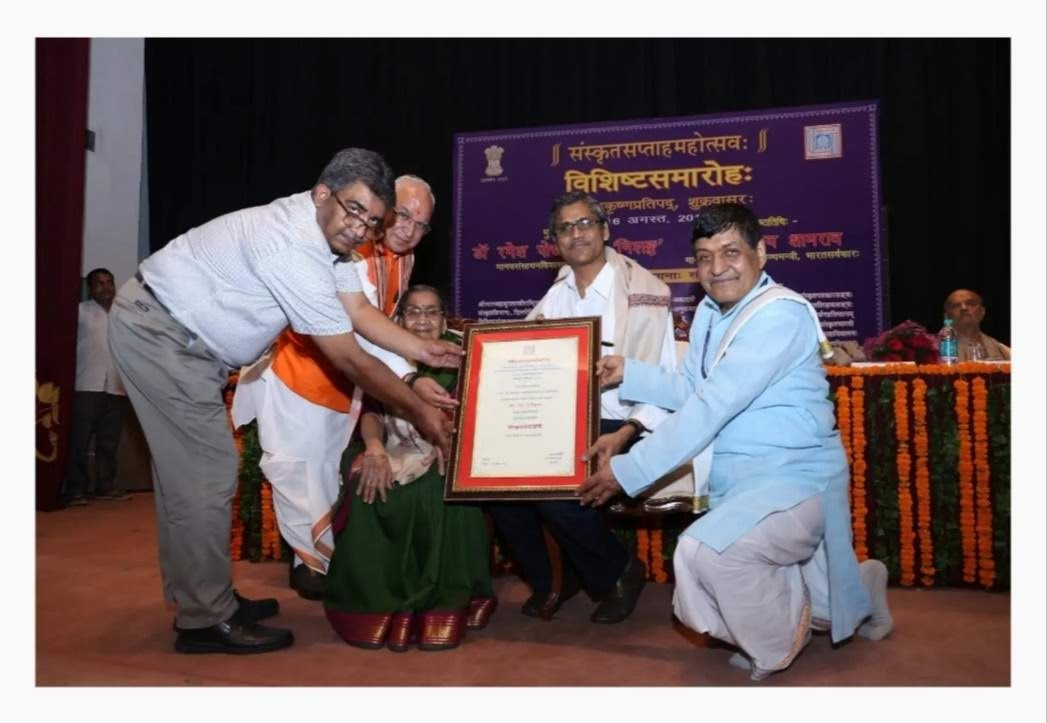
Dr. Dantu Muralikrishna receiving Vishist Sanskrit Sevavrati award by Ministry of Human Resource Development, Government of India in August 2019, in New Delhi

- Sambhavami Yuge Yuge, Audio label by Natraj Music Company, 2018 (Sanskrit-Telugu), ASIN BD7GHszzzxs
- Sambhavami Yuge Yuge, Audio label by Natraj Music Company, 2018 (Sanskrit-Hindi), ASIN BD7GHszzzxs
- Book of Bhagavadgita in Hindi (Sambhavami Yuge Yuge ), Indra Publishing, 2018, ISBN 1545716749.
- Book of Bhagavadgita in Telugu (Sambhavami Yuge Yuge ), Indra Publishing, 2018, ISBN 9789384535926
- Sambhavami Yuge Yuge, Audio label by Natraj Music Company, 2020 (Sanskrit-English)
- Bhagavad Gita and Yoga; International Journal of Yoga and Allied; Dec 2019,
- Human Values in Spirituality; UGC Care Journal ISSN 2394-3114 Vol-40, Issue:5-March-2020
- Master Of Life Management, January 2022, p;648, ISBN 9390542529
- "Jeevan Gita", July 2024, p;630, ISBN 978-81-19581-93-1

== Awards and honors ==
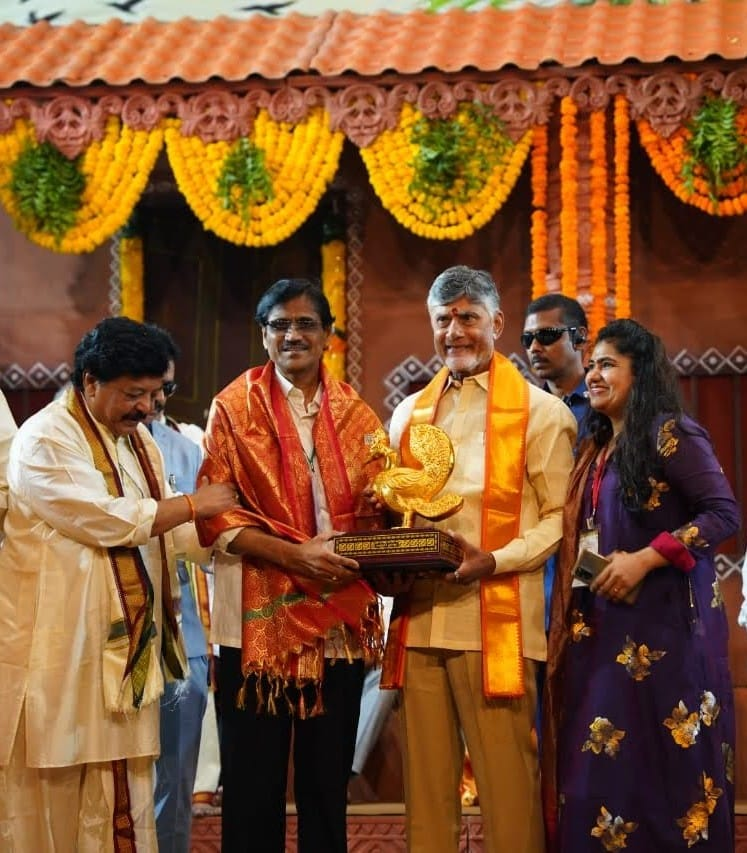
Dr murali Krishna receiving Kala Ratna award by Chief minister of Andhra Pradesh N Chandrababu Naidu

- Sahitya Akademi Award 2024 by Government of Madhya Pradesh for his work on his book "Jeevan Gita"
- Kala Ratna Award (Hamsa) 2025" from honorable Chief minister of Andhra Pradesh N. Chandrababu Naidu for his work on Bhagavad-Gita in different languages with Management concepts in different formats such as Audio albums and authoring Books, etc.
- Vishist Sanskrit Sevavrati award 2019 from the Ministry of Human Resource Development, Government of India, on the occasion of World Sanskrit Day, organized by Rashtriya Sanskrit Sansthan New Delhi. This award consists of prize money of ₹100,000.
- In January 2020, Dr. Dantu Muralikrishna Set the world record for International Book of Records for creating Maximum Audio Albums of Bhagavad Gita in Multiple Languages
- In January 2020, Dr. Dantu Muralikrishna's name entered in "India Book of Records" for creating an audio album on Bhagavad Gita Shlokas.
- In February 2020, Dr.Muralikrishna got the title of "Grand Master“ by “Asia Book of Records" for creation of albums on Bhagavad-Gita
- Another Best Paper Awards from International Journal of Human Resource Management
- In January 2021, Dr. Dantu Muralikrishna was awarded with 'International Icon Award' and 'Rashtriya Gaurav Samman'
- Dantu Murali Krishna was awarded with Visionary Leader of the Year 2021. He also received Primeminister's Appreciation letter from Prime Minister's Office (India) for his contribution towards education skill development and research.

== See also ==
- List of Indian writers
