= Menas Kafatos =

American physicist (born 1945)

Menas C. Kafatos
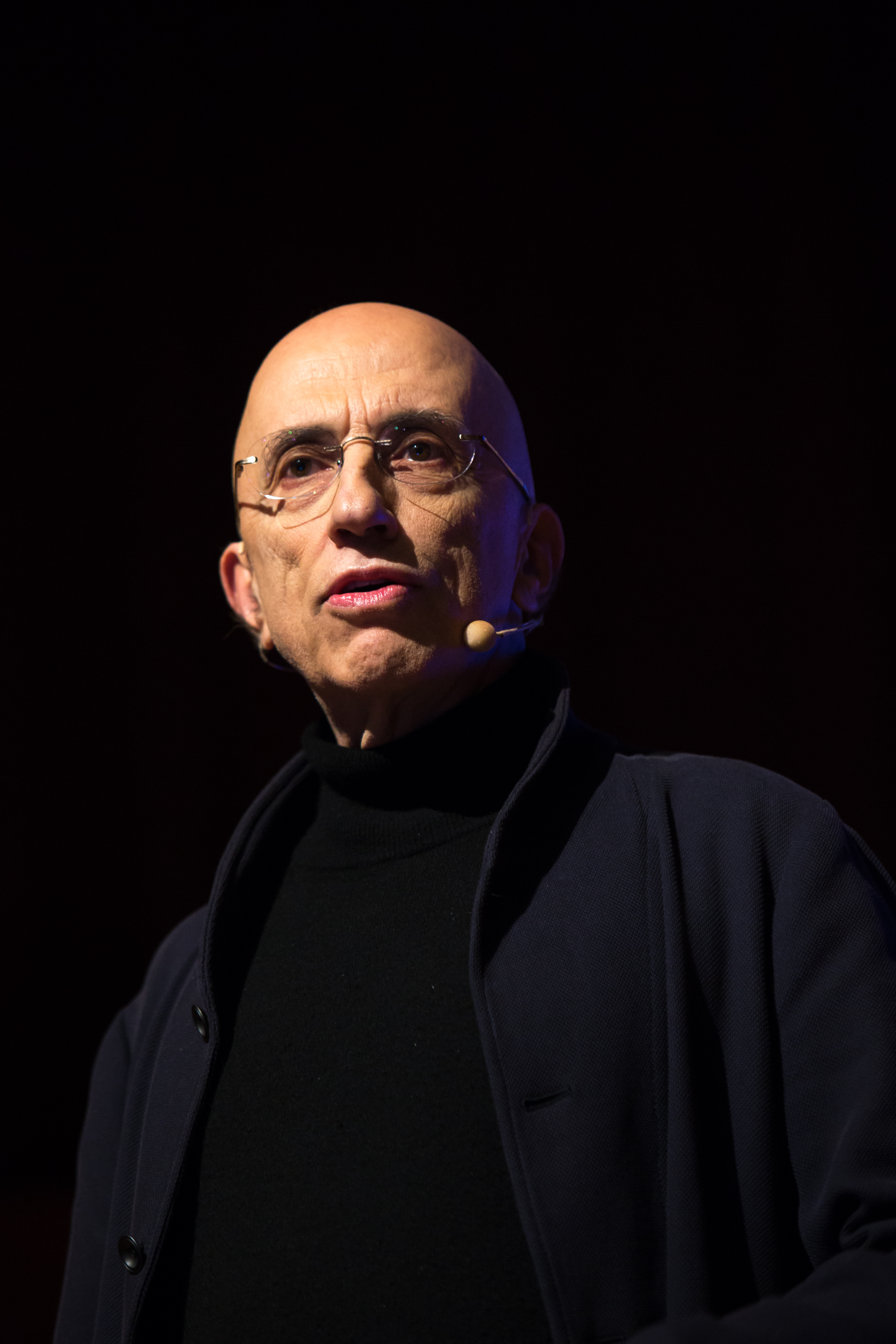
- Born: March 25, 1945 (age 81); Crete, Greece
- Education: Cornell University (BA); Massachusetts Institute of Technology (PhD)
- Spouse: Susan Yang
- Awards: Honorary Member, Romanian Academy of Sciences (2000), Rustum Roy Award, Chopra Foundation (2011), IEEE Orange County Chapter, Outstanding Leadership and Professional Service Award (2011)
- Scientific career
- Fields: Cosmology, natural hazards, climate change, spirituality, philosophy
- Workplaces: Chapman University, Center of Excellence in Earth Systems Modeling and Observations (CEESMO)

Menas C. Kafatos (Greek: Μηνάς Καφάτος; born 25 March 1945) is a Greek-born American physicist and a writer on spirituality and science. His publications include: The Nonlocal Universe and The Conscious Universe. Kafatos has written and lectured extensively promoting discourse between science, spirituality, and religion. He has held numerous positions at institutions including Chapman University, George Mason University, and NASA Goddard Space Flight Center.

== Career ==
Kafatos received his B.A. in physics from Cornell University in 1967 and a Ph.D. in physics from the Massachusetts Institute of Technology (MIT) in 1972. After postdoctoral work at NASA Goddard Space Flight Center, he joined George Mason University and was University Professor of Interdisciplinary Sciences from 1984-2008, where he also served as dean of the School of Computational Sciences and director of the Center for Earth Observing and Space Research. He and a team of computational scientists joined Chapman University in the fall of 2008, where he was the Founding Dean of the Schmid College of Science and Technology serving as dean from 2009 – 2012. He currently is the director of the Center of Excellence in Earth Systems Modeling and Observations (CEESMO).

Kafatos has authored books including The Conscious Universe, The Non-local Universe (with Robert Nadeau, Springer-Verlag and Oxford University Press), Principles of Integrative Science (with Mihai Draganescu, Romanian Academy of Sciences Press), and more than 300 peer reviewed publications, cited by over 750 other articles.

Menas was one of the speakers in Bhagavad Gita Summit (from 10–1 December 2021) during Gita Jayanti at Dallas, Texas, US along with other notable personalities such as Swami Mukundananda Ji, Mr. Shiv Khera, Kiran Bedi, Brahmacharini Gloria Arieira, Dantu Muralikrishna and others.

=== Research ===
Kafatos' peer-reviewed research has focused on cosmology, astrophysics, natural hazards, climate change, Earth system science, and remote sensing. Although he has written books around meta-physical interpretations of quantum phenomena he does not have substantial peer-reviewed work in quantum physics.

Notable scientific contributions include enhancements to synthetic tropical cyclone (hurricane) circulations used in forecast models, new perspectives on the self organization of the universe through the lens of complexity, a detailed look at the relationship between vegetation in the United States and El Niño/Southern Oscillation, and a better understanding of dust and aerosols over India.

== Personal life ==
Kafatos lives in Marina Del Rey, California, with his wife Susan Yang, a scientist in the fields of computational biology, experimental biology, and neuroscience. They met while working together at George Mason University. His brother, Fotis Kafatos, was a biologist and founder and honorary president of the European Research Council (ERC). Kafatos has 3 children: Lefteris, Stefanos, and Alexios. He is the chairman of the board for the American Hellenic Council.

== Awards and honors ==
=== Awards ===
- 1986 George Mason University Distinguished Faculty Award
- 2011 Chopra Foundation Spirit of Rustum Roy Award
- 2011 IEEE Orange County Chapter Outstanding Leadership and Professional Service Award

=== Honors ===
- 2000 Romanian Academy of Sciences Honorary Member
- 2013 National Observatory of Athens Affiliated Researcher
- 2013 Kyung Hee University International Scholar
