= José Carreño =

José Carreño may refer to:

- José Carreño (painter), Ecuadorian painter
- José Manuel Carreño, Cuban ballet dancer
- José Carreño (shot putter), Venezuelan athlete
- José Daniel Carreño, Uruguayan football manager
- José Luis Carreño, Spanish Catholic missionary
- José María Carreño, Venezuelan politician and military
