= José Luis Carreño =

Missionary and college founder

José Luis Carreño Etxeandía S. D. B. (23 October 1905 – 29 May 1986) was a Spanish Roman Catholic priest.

He was a missionary in India and the Philippines, founder of the Indian institution Sacred Heart College, Thirupattur, Vellore District, and a member of the Salesians of Don Bosco. He was also a poet, musician and writer, with a special interest in the Shroud of Turin (see Bibliography below). He has been called the most loved Salesian in South India, at least in the first part of the twentieth century. Pascual Chavez Villanueva, Rector Major of the Salesians, speaks of him as "the great missionary of India and of the Philippines in the footsteps of St Francis Xavier".

== Early life ==
Born on 23 October 1905 to Rogelio and Teresa, Carreño entered the Salesian school of Santander, Spain, in November 1913. He later attended the school for aspiring Salesians at Campello. From Campello, he proceeded to the Salesian novitiate at Carabanchel Alto in 1921 and made his first profession on 25 July 1922. After a brief period of military service, he made his perpetual profession at Sarrìa on 11 December 1928. He was ordained as a priest at Gerona on 21 May 1932.

== India ==
Having volunteered for the missions, he spent a year at Cowley, England, studying English. He set sail for India and landed in Bombay in 1933. When the second Salesian province was formed in South India, with its provincial house at Vellore, Carreño, not yet 28 years old, was sent to as novice master to Tirupattur. In August 1939, India felt the echoes of World War II. All foreigners, including missionaries who belonged to countries at war with Great Britain, were taken to concentration camps in 1942. Carreño, belonging to a neutral country, was not disturbed, and was able to mediate for his fellow Salesians before the authorities.

== Provincial, South India ==
In 1943, in the middle of the war, Carreño received a message over the Vatican Radio to take the place of Eligio Cinato, the provincial of the Southern province, who had been interned. At the same time, the Salesian Archbishop Louis Mathias of Madras invited him to be his Vicar General. In 1945 Carreño was officially appointed provincial. The Salesian centres doubled under the leadership of Carreño: Kotagiri (1946), Poonamallee (1947), Nagercoil (1947). In his term Fr Aurelius Maschio managed to buy land in Mumbai and begin building what is today Don Bosco High School (Matunga).

Carreño's set up a university college in the remote and large Dalit village of Tirupattur.

Carreño was also largely responsible for 'Indianizing' the face of the Salesians in India, by searching for local recruits instead of relying solely on missionaries.

== Goa ==
At the end of the war, some of the interned Salesians were not allowed to stay on in British India, and went to Goa, then a Portuguese enclave. The first Salesian to enter Goa was Vincenzo Scuderi. He was followed by a group of seven others, including Giuseppe Moja. In October 1952, Carreño was sent to Goa, where he stayed for eight years. During this time the work expanded to include two technical schools, a high and elementary school, two public churches, one of them in Panjim dedicated to the Pilgrim Virgin; the care of more than 600 poor boys, the presses, the Catholic Hour on the government radio station, and the work for vocations. When the Indian government broke diplomatic relations with Portugal over the issue of Goa, Carreño was called by the Prime Minister, Jawaharlal Nehru, to act as an intermediary in the liberation of Indian prisoners in Goa. Four months later Goa granted amnesty to the Indian prisoners. Between Madras and Goa, Carreño spent almost thirty years in India.

== Philippines and Spain ==
From Goa he was assigned to work in the Philippines. He arrived in 1962, where he stayed for 3 years.

During his stay in the Philippines, there were differences of opinion about ways of going ahead with the Salesian work, between missionaries who had come from China and others like Carreño who had come from India and elsewhere.

He went back to Spain where he founded the Hogar del Misionero (House for Missionaries). He died on May 29, 1986, in Spain.

== Writer and poet ==
Carreño was a prolific writer of popular books. Some of them, such as G in M ("God in a Mirror"), were apologias. Many were religious. His books on the Shroud of Turin have been translated into several languages (see Bibliography below), and may still be found in print. He encouraged others to write; evidence of this is his election as Patron of the Konkani writers association in Goa during his stay there.

Among his musical compositions was the Latin hymn "Cor Iesu Sacratissimum", and "Siam Salesiani", sung in English translation as "We are Salesians". Among his more popular compositions was Kotagiri on the mountain, Tirupattur on the plain.

== Bibliography ==
=== Primary ===
- G in M [God in a Mirror]. Panjim.
- Warp in the Loom.
- El Retrato de Cristo – Ed. Centro Nacional Salesiano, Madrid, 1968 (Spanish)
- El último reportero – Ed. Don Bosco, Pamplona, 1976. (Spanish)
- La Sindone, último reportero – Ed. Paoline, Alba, 1977.
- Las huellas de la Resurreccion – Ed. Don Bosco, Pamplona 1978 (Spanish)
- Al cerrarse la urna de la Sabana de Cristo – Ed. Don Bosco, Madrid, 1980 (Spanish)
- A Mini Guide to the Shroud of Christ – Salesian Mission, New Rochelle (N.Y.), 1980 (English)
- La Sábana Santa, resumen del último reportero – Ed. Don Bosco, México, 1980. (Spanish)
- Es el Señor! New Rochelle, New York, 1980 (Spanish)
- La Sábana Santa – Ed. Don Bosco, México 1981. (Spanish)
- La señal – Madrid: Liber Signorum, 1983. (Spanish)
- Urdimbre En El Telar: Narra Un Misionero.
- Prisma blanco. Centro Nacional Salesiano de Pastoral Juvenil, 1968.
- Prisma rosa. CCS.
- Prisma rojo. III. Centro Nacional Salesiano de Pastoral Juvenil, 1968.
- Singladuras indias. Madrid: Central Catequistica Salesiana, 1974.
- Perlas modernas (de importación): presentadas desde muy lejos de la Patria a los muchachos españoles. Centro Nacional Salesiano de Pastoral Juvenil, 1969.
- El Marques De Mora. 3ª Edicion. Razon y Fe, 1914.
- Recuerdos De Fernan Caballero. El Mensajero Del C. De Jesus.
- Pequeñeces : Obras Completas, Tomo Viii, edicion 1950.
- "Cosas De La India". Madrid: Sociedad Editora Iberica, 1948.
- El Pan Que Cristo Nos Dio: Vivencias al Resplandor De La Lamparita Roja. Madrid : Editorial CCS, 1985.
- Salmos al viento. Ensayo de popularizacion Literario-Musical del Salterio. Alcala, Madrid: Vocaciones Filipinas Salesianas (VOFISA), 1967.
- A tí levanto mi alma. Vol. 2 of La zarza ardiente. Madrid: Editorial CCS, 1993.
- Chispas del tropico. Madrid: Editorial CCS, 1994.
- Pistas en el valle (extracto de La señal). Hogar del Misionero, 1985.
- Porque me hice misionero. CCL.
- Micro-guia de la Sabana de Cristo. CCL.
- La educación en la India de Gandhi y Nehru. Madrid: [FAE], 1952.

=== Secondary ===
- Rico, José Antonio. José Luis Carreño Etxeandía Obrero de Dios. Pamplona: Instituto Politécnico Salesiano, 1986.
- Rico, José. "José Luis Carreño". The Memory of the Salesian Province of Bombay 1928–1998. Ed. Peter Gonsalves. Mumbai – Matunga: Province Information Office, Don Bosco Provincial House, 1998. 60–62.
- Thekkedath, J. A History of the Salesians of Don Bosco in India from the beginning up to 1951–42. Bangalore: Kristu Jyoti Publications, 2005. 2 vols.
- Diaz, Elias. “How God brought the Salesians to the Konkan Region.” SDB West 17/2 (Nov–Dec 1999).
- Chávez Villanueva, Pascual. Letter in Acts of the General Council of the Salesians of Don Bosco 383 (September 2003). pp. 24–26: "Don José Carreno (1905–1986)."
- Arlegui Suescun, José. "José Luis Carreno Etxeandia (1905–1986): Salesian Missionary Priest." Bosco Udayam: A Journal of Salesian Spirituality 45/3 (2015) 12–25.
- "A True Don Bosco Oratorian. Fr. Joseph Carreno (1905–1986)." http://donboscooratory.com/a-true-don-bosco-oratorian-fr-joseph-carreno-1905-1986/
