= Anu Peshawaria =

Indian-American immigration lawyer, author, activist and philanthropist

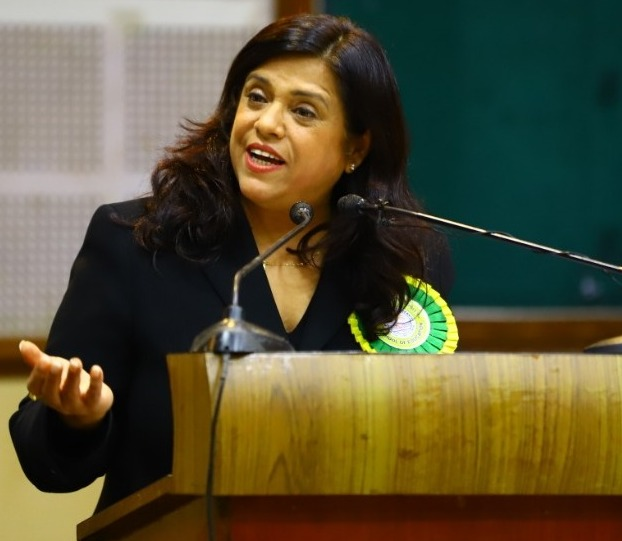
- Born: 5 September 1961 (age 64); Amritsar, Punjab, India
- Citizenship: American
- Education: University of Delhi; Stanford University, California; Santa Clara University, California
- Occupation: Attorney
- Known for: U.S. immigration law
- Parents: Prakash Lal Peshawaria; Prem Lata
- Relatives: Kiran Bedi (Sister)
- Website: anupeshawaria.com

Anu Peshawaria (born 5 September 1961) is an Indian-American US Immigration lawyer, author, activist, and philanthropist having founded several non profits and a former Wimbledon tennis player from the United States. Her legal work focuses on immigrant rights, domestic violence, women's rights, and children's rights, and she has practiced immigration law before the Supreme Court of the United States, Supreme Court of Washington, and Supreme Court of India. She was the first legal advisor appointed by the Govt of India to the US Embassy in Washington DC. She was also Former India's No 1 Women's tennis Champion. She founded "Seva Legal Aid" to help victims of hate crimes & domestic abuse. She also won major International tennis tournaments around the world including playing for India at Wimbledon in 1979. She has assisted survivors from all around the world, varying from India, South America, Syria, Iraq, Afghanistan, Africa, Somalia & Burma.

== Early life and education ==
Peshawaria was born in Amritsar, and graduated from University of Delhi with a Political Science & Economics Degree in 1980 and earner her LLB degree in law from the University of Delhi, Law Center in 1983. She is the youngest of four daughters. Her elder sister is Kiran Bedi.

== Career ==
Anu Peshawaria is currently practicing International law in the US and India and strongly advocates for Immigration, legal and human rights law, with over 25 years of experience. She is the first female Legal Adviser for the Indian Embassy in Washington DC and has won multiple awards for her legal achievements. She also functions as the legal adviser for consulates across New York, Chicago, San Francisco, Houston, alongside being a speaker, author, and activist.

== Writing ==
Peshawaria is the author of three self-published books, Immigrants Dream (2009), Lives on the Brink (2012), and Never Again (2019). She is also a columnist for the Indian Express, and has written articles on topics like crime, domestic abuse, and immigration.

== Awards and recognition ==
She was granted Alien of Extraordinary Ability status in the year (2000) presented by the Immigration and Naturalization Service of the U.S. for exemplary athletic, human rights, and legal/social achievements. She is a member of the American Immigration Lawyers Association (AILA). She was awarded an Award of Excellence by California's Secretary for upholding immigration rights, in particular those of women and spreading social awareness. She was awarded the Take Action against domestic violence Award by the King County Coalition Against Domestic Violence in King County of Washington for her efforts to end domestic violence, and the Bharat Nirman Award – 1990, Awarded by the President of India. She was awarded the Mahatma Award for social impact on 1 October 2021 in Delhi, India.
