= Vincenzo Scuderi =

Vincenzo Scuderi, born 30 May 1902 in Ramacca near Catania in Sicily, was a Catholic priest belonging to the Society of St Francis de Sales (Salesians of Don Bosco), one of the great members of this Society in India, and pioneer of the Salesian work in Goa, including Don Bosco, Panjim. He died on 22 November 1982 at Catania, Sicily.

== Early life ==
Scuderi did his early schooling with the Salesians at St Philip Neri School, Catania. He showed early promise as a student and leader. He joined the Salesian Congregation, and was ordained in 1926.

== India ==
He opted for the missions of India, and reached Shillong at the end of December 1928. Within two years, in June 1931, he was appointed in charge of the Assam plains, together with Frs Archimedes Pianazzi and Antonio Alessi. In 1934 he was appointed Provincial, with jurisdiction over Assam, Bengal and Uttar Pradesh. A few months later, he was also appointed Apostolic Administrator of the diocese of Krishnagar. His secretary was the young Giuseppe Moja In June 1940, Msgr. Scuderi was taken prisoner with other Italian Salesians by the British, since Italy had entered World War II on the side of Germany. He spent time in several camps all over India: Fort William (Calcutta), Ahmednagar, Deolali, Dehradun, and finally Purandar. The Salesians in these camps even underwent a whole course of theology and received ordination. In Purandar, Scuderi even began schools for children of the prisoners, of the servants, and of the sweepers.

== Pioneer in Goa ==
When the British made it clear he would have to go, he opted for the Portuguese territory of Goa, so as not to leave India. There a new saga of six years, with a group of volunteers who followed him, began. He started with the Oratory and a Portuguese primary school, followed by a technical school and English High School; two other festive and daily oratories in town; a technical school in Valpoi; he even bought a plot in Panjim, the capital, and built a chapel that soon became a centre of devotion for hundreds. Scuderi is thus the founder of the Salesian work in Goa, which now includes foundations in Panjim, Odxel, Parra, Paliem, Tuem, Fatorda, Loutolim, Benaulim, besides other foundations in southern Maharashtra and coastal Karnataka. Msgr. Vincent Scuderi was 24 years in India: He was roughly 12 years in Assam and Bengal(1928-1940); he spent 6 years as a prisoner (1940 to 1946) and the remaining 6 years in Goa.

== Last years in Italy ==
However, broken by two major hernia operations and a severe bout of typhoid, he was called back to Italy. His place in Goa was taken by Fr Jose Luis Carreno, who can be called the second great Salesian pioneer of Goa. Here he worked in Caltanisetta, Gela, and Riesi, before retiring to Catania. His volcanic dynamism marked his passage in all these places.
