= Kiran Bedi =

First female Indian Police Service Officer (born 1949) first IPS

Her Excellency Kiran Bedi PPMG PNBB
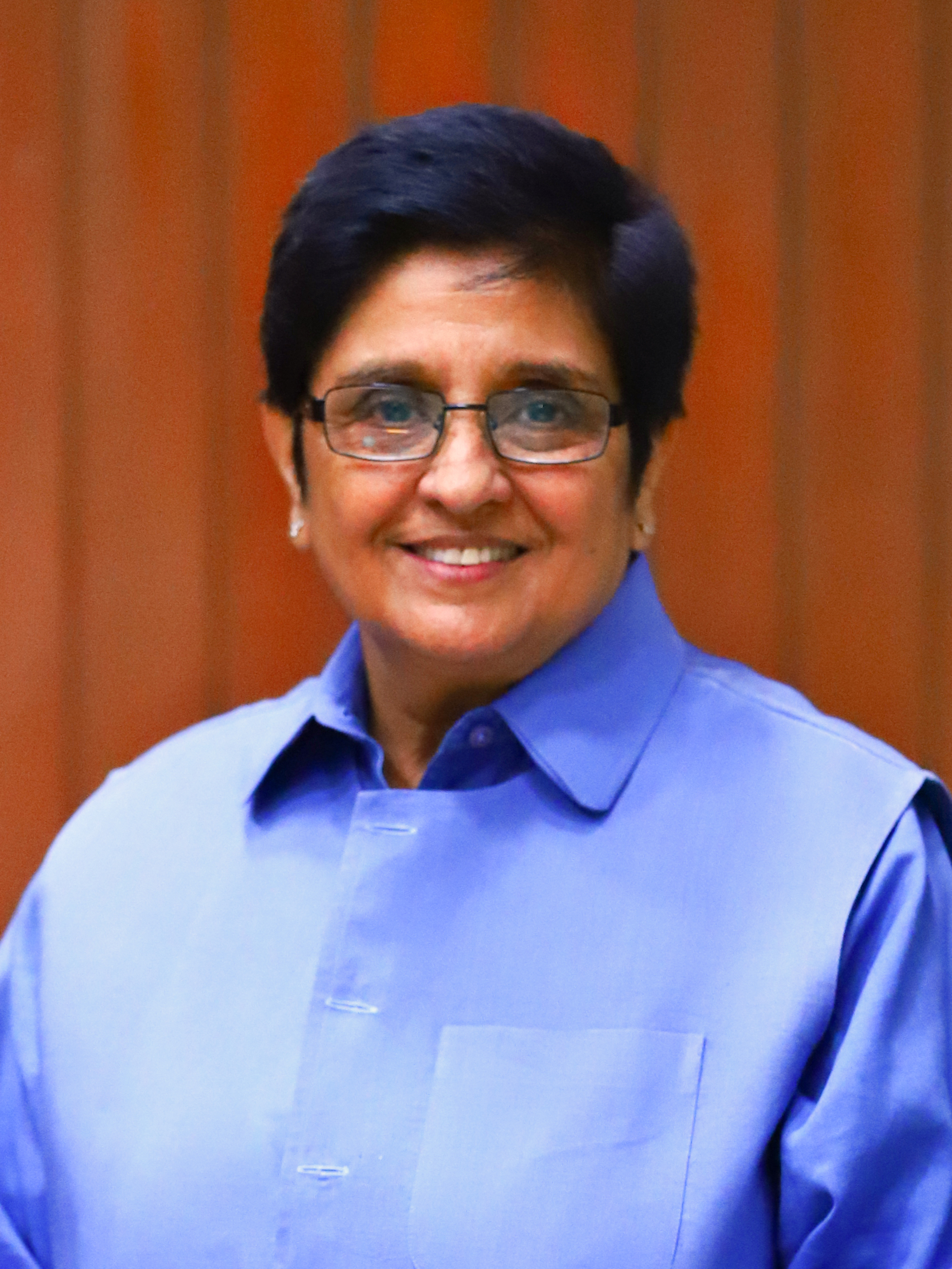

24th Lieutenant Governor of Pondicherry
- In office 28 May 2016 – 16 February 2021
- Chief Minister: V. Narayanasamy
- Preceded by: A. K. Singh
- Succeeded by: Tamilisai Soundararajan (additional charge)

Director General of Bureau of Police Research and Development
- In office 2005 – 2007

Police Adviser and Director of United Nations Police
- In office 2003 – 2005

Personal details
- Born: Kiran Peshawaria; 9 June 1949 (age 77) Amritsar, Punjab, India
- Citizenship: Indian
- Party: Bharatiya Janata Party
- Other political affiliations: National Democratic Alliance
- Spouse: Brij Bedi (m. 1972; died 2016)
- Children: 1
- Parents: Prakash Lal Peshawaria; Prem Lata
- Relatives: Anu Peshawaria (Sister), Tek Chandra Arora
- Education: Sacred Heart Convent School; Cambridge College
- Alma mater: S.R. Govt. College (BA Hons) (MA); Delhi University (LLB); IIT Delhi (PhD)
- Occupation: Athlete, Police Officer and Politician
- Awards: United Nations Medal, 2004; Ramon Magsaysay Award, 1994; President's Police Medal, 1979

Kiran Bedi PPMG PNBB (born 9 June 1949) is a former tennis player who became the first Indian woman to join the officer ranks of the Indian Police Service (IPS) in 1972 and was the 24th lieutenant governor of Puducherry from 28 May 2016 to 16 February 2021. She remained in service for 35 years before taking voluntary retirement in 2007 as Director General, Bureau of Police Research and Development.

As a teenager, Bedi was crowned the national junior tennis champion in 1966. Between 1965 and 1978, she won several titles at various national and state-level championships. After joining the IPS, Bedi served in Delhi, Goa, Chandigarh and Mizoram. She started her career as an Assistant Superintendent of Police (ASP) in the Chanakyapuri area of Delhi, and won the President's Police Medal in 1979. Next, she moved to West Delhi, where she brought about a reduction in crimes against women. Subsequently, as a traffic police officer, she oversaw traffic arrangements for the 1982 Asian Games in Delhi and the Commonwealth Heads of Government Meeting 1983 in Goa. As Deputy Commissioner of Police of North Delhi, she launched a campaign against drug abuse, which evolved into the Navjyoti Delhi Police Foundation (renamed to Navjyoti India Foundation in 2007).

In May 1993, Bedi was posted to the Delhi Prisons as Inspector General (IG). She introduced several reforms at Tihar Jail, which won her the Ramon Magsaysay Award in 1994. In 2003, Bedi became the first Indian and first woman to be appointed head of the United Nations Police and Police Advisor in the United Nations Department of Peace Operations. She resigned in 2007, to focus on social activism and writing. She runs the India Vision Foundation. During 2008–11, she hosted a court show Aap Ki Kachehri. She was one of the key leaders of the 2011 Indian anti-corruption movement, and joined the Bharatiya Janata Party (BJP) in January 2015. She unsuccessfully contested the 2015 Delhi Assembly election as the party's chief minister candidate.

== Early life and education ==
Kiran Peshawaria was born on 9 June 1949 in Amritsar, Punjab, India, into a Punjabi business family. She is the second child of Prakash Lal Peshawaria and Prem Lata (born Janak Arora). She has three sisters: Shashi, Reeta, and Anu. Her great-great-grandfather Lala Hargobind had migrated from Peshawar to Amritsar, where he set up a business. Bedi's upbringing was not very religious, but she was brought up in both Hindu and Sikh traditions (her grandmother was a Sikh, although her other family members were Hindu). Prakash Lal helped with the family's textile business, and also played tennis.

Bedi's grandfather Muni Lal controlled the family business and gave an allowance to her father. He cut this allowance when Bedi's elder sister Shashi was enrolled in the Sacred Heart Convent School, Amritsar. Although the school was 16 km away from their home, Shashi's parents believed it offered a better education than other schools. Muni Lal was opposed to his grandchild being educated in a Christian school. However, Prakash Lal declared financial independence and enrolled all his daughters, including Kiran, in the same school. Bedi started her formal studies in 1954, at the Sacred Heart Convent School in Amritsar. She participated in National Cadet Corps (NCC), among other extra-curricular activities. At that time, Sacred Heart did not offer science; instead, it had a subject called "household", which was aimed at grooming girls into being good housewives.

When Bedi was in Class 9, she joined the Cambridge College, a private institute that offered science education and prepared her for the matriculation exam. By the time her former schoolmates at Sacred Heart cleared Class 9, she cleared the Class 10 (matriculation) exam. Bedi graduated in 1968, with a Bachelor of Arts (Honours) in English, from Government College for Women at Amritsar. The same year, she won the NCC Cadet Officer Award. In 1970, she obtained a master's degree in political science from Panjab University in Chandigarh.

From 1970 to 1972, Bedi taught as a lecturer at Khalsa College for Women in Amritsar. She taught courses related to political science. Later, during her career in the Indian Police Service, she also earned a Bachelors of Law degree from the Faculty of Law, University of Delhi in 1988 and a Doctorate of Philosophy from the Indian Institute of Technology - Delhi's Department of Humanities and Social Sciences in New Delhi in 1993.

== Tennis career ==
Inspired by her father, Bedi started playing tennis at the age of nine. As a teenage tennis player, she cut her hair short as it interfered with her game. In 1964, she played her first tournament outside Amritsar, participating in the national junior lawn tennis championship at Delhi Gymkhana. She lost in early rounds, but came back to win the trophy two years later, in 1966. As the national champion, she was eligible for entry to the Wimbledon junior championship, but was not nominated by the Indian administration.

Between 1965 and 1978, Bedi won several tennis championships in India, including:

Title	Year	Place	Notes / Source
Junior National Lawn Tennis Championship	1966	Amritsar	
All-India Intervarsity Tennis Title	1968	Vishakhapatnam	With her younger sister Reeta. The pair won the championship three years in a row.
Northern India Lawn Tennis Championship	1970	Chandigarh	
Asian Lawn Tennis Championship	1972	Pune	
All-India Hard Court Tennis Championship	1974		
All India Interstate Women's Lawn Tennis Championship	1975	New Delhi	
National Women's Lawn Tennis Championship	1976	Chandigarh	
Gold medal, National Sports Festival for Women	1976	New Delhi	With her sister Anu

Bedi was also a part of the Indian team that beat Sri Lanka to win the Lionel Fonseka Memorial Trophy in Colombo. She continued playing tennis until the age of thirty, when she started focusing on her Indian Police Service career. In 1972, she married fellow tennis player Brij Bedi; the two had met on Service Club courts in Amritsar.

== Indian Police Service Career ==
As a young woman, Bedi frequented the Service Club in Amritsar, where interaction with senior civil servants inspired her to take up a public service career. On 16 July 1972, Bedi started her police training at the National Academy of Administration in Mussoorie. She was the only woman in a batch of 80 men, and became the first woman IPS officer. After a 6-month foundation course, she underwent another 9 months of police training at Mount Abu in Rajasthan, and further training with Punjab Police in 1974. Based on a draw, she was allocated to the union territory cadre (now called AGMUT or Arunachal Pradesh-Goa-Mizoram-Union Territories cadre).

=== First posting in Delhi ===
Bedi's first posting was to the Chandni Chowk subdivision of Delhi in 1975. The same year, she became the first woman to lead the all-male contingent of the Delhi Police at the Republic Day Parade in 1975. Her daughter Sukriti (later Saina) was born in September 1975.

Chandni Chowk was an affluent area that included the Parliament building, fish markets, and the residences of the Prime Minister and the President. The crimes in the area were mainly limited to minor thefts, but political demonstrations (which sometimes turned violent) were a regular occurrence. During the 1980s, there were many clashes between Nirankari and Akali Sikhs. On 3 December, a group of Nirankaris held a congregation near India Gate. A contingent of 700–800 Akalis organized a demonstration against them. DCP Bedi's platoon was deployed to stop the protesters and prevent violence. As the protesters resorted to brick-batting, Bedi charged them with a cane, although there was no tear gas squad to support her unit. One of the demonstrators ran towards her with a naked sword, but she charged him as well as other demonstrators with a cane. Ultimately, her unit was able to disperse the demonstrators. For this action, Bedi was awarded the President's Police Medal for Gallantry (1979), in October 1980.

In 1979, Bedi was posted to Delhi's West District, where there were not enough officers to handle the high volume of criminal activity. To compensate, she started recruiting civilian volunteers. Each village in the district was night patrolled by six civilians led by an armed policeman. She enabled anonymous reporting of any knowledge about crimes. She clamped down on bootlegging and the illicit liquor business to reduce crimes in the area. Bedi implemented an open door policy, which encouraged citizens to interact with her. She implemented a "beat box" system: a complaint box was installed in each ward, and the beat constables were instructed to have their lunch near this box at a set time each day. She regularly asked people if they knew about the beat constable assigned to their area, and also walked with the constables to raise their self-esteem. Within 3 months, there was a reduction in crimes. There was a drop in cases related to "eve teasing" (sexual harassment of women) and wife beating. This gained her the goodwill of local women, who also volunteered their services to help fight crime in the area.

In October 1981, Bedi was made DCP (Traffic). The preparation for the 1982 Asian Games had caused traffic snarls in the city. The construction of 19 sports stadiums and several flyovers had resulted in a number of blockades and diversions. Bedi encouraged coordination between the Municipal Corporation of Delhi, Delhi Electric Supply Undertaking and Delhi Development Authority. She clamped down on errant motorists with a heavy hand. She replaced challans (traffic tickets) with spot fines. Her team towed improperly parked vehicles using six tow trucks ("cranes") for traffic control. This earned her the nickname "Crane Bedi". On 5 August 1982, an Ambassador car (DHI 1817) belonging to Prime Minister Office was towed away by sub-inspector Nirmal Singh, as it was wrongly parked outside the Yusufzai Market at Connaught Place. Singh was fully supported by Bedi and her superior Ashok Tandon.

To raise funds for traffic guidance materials, Bedi presented Asian Games traffic management plan to a group of sponsors. The sponsors committed to providing road safety and other educational material worth ₹35 lakh. She also bought traffic police jeeps for her officers; for the first time, four wheelers were allocated to inspectors in the traffic unit. After the Asian Games were over, she was given Asian Jyoti award for excellence. She refused to accept the award for herself alone, and recommended that it be given to entire traffic unit.

Bedi did not spare errant motorists from the rich and influential section of society, which resulted in a powerful lobby against her. Her victims included the director of the Central Bureau of Investigation and her own sister-in-law. After the Asian Games were over, she was transferred to Goa for 3 years. According to contemporary rumours, Indira Gandhi's aides R. K. Dhawan and Yashpal Kapoor, as well as her yoga instructor Dhirendra Brahmachari (whom Bedi had personally fined for a wrongly parked car), played a role in her transfer. According to another theory, the loss of revenue resulting from her experiment of holding classes for traffic violators (instead of fining them) was a major factor in her transfer.

Her 7-year-old daughter suffered from nephritic syndrome since the age of 3, and was seriously ill at the time. Bedi requested the Home Ministry not to transfer her out of Delhi until her daughter's condition became stable. According to Bedi, she had put herself in a "very vulnerable situation", and the only people who could help her were the ones "who had been offended by my 'equal enforcement of law'". Her request was not entertained, and she had to leave behind her daughter, who was too ill to accompany her.

=== Goa ===
Bedi arrived in Goa in March 1983, on a three-year assignment. A few months after her arrival, the Zuari Bridge was completed but not opened to public; the state government wanted Indira Gandhi to come from Delhi and inaugurate it formally. However, they were not able to secure confirmation from Indira Gandhi for several days. The public had to use ferries to transfer their vehicles across the Zuari River. One day, during a patrol, Bedi noticed that there was a huge mass at the ferry boarding point. She drove to the bridge, removed the blockades and diverted the traffic waiting at ferry to the bridge. This unofficial inauguration angered many politicians. In November 1983, Goa hosted the Commonwealth Heads of Government Meet (CHOGM). Bedi involved NCC cadets in Goa for traffic regulation along the VIP routes.

Shortly after the CHOGM ended, her daughter's medical condition worsened. Bedi applied for leave, so that she could go to Delhi and take care of her daughter. Until this point, she had not taken privilege leave in her decade-long career, and her leaves had always lapsed. Inspector General of Police (IGP) Rajendra Mohan recommended her leave application, but the leave was not officially sanctioned by the Goa government. Bedi left for Delhi anyway, since she had enough leaves in her account. Her daughter was hospitalised at AIIMS for one week. After her daughter was discharged from hospital, Bedi decided to stay in Delhi until her recovery. Bedi sent a personal letter to the IGP, as well as a detailed explanation to the Goa government, with medical reports and certificates. However, in a statement to United News of India (UNI), the Goa Chief Minister Pratapsingh Rane declared her absconding and absent without leave. After seeing Bedi's daughter's condition in Delhi, UNI published a rebuttal to the chief minister's statement. This made Goa government even more hostile to Bedi.

=== Back to Delhi ===
After being declared absent without sanctioned leave, Bedi was not given any assignment for six months. When her daughter's condition became stable, she met the Union Home Secretary T. N. Chaturvedi, who reinstated her. She was assigned to the Railway Protection Force in New Delhi, as a Deputy Commandant. Six months later, after appealing to a senior official in Prime Minister's Office, she was reassigned to the Department of Industrial Development, as a deputy director. There, she worked under the Directorate General of Industrial Contingency (DGIC), as a strike mediator between labor and management. Bedi left DGIC in October 1985, and shortly after her departure, the organization was wound up as part of an economy drive.

In 1985, Police Commissioner Ved Marwah made a special request for Bedi to be assigned to the police headquarters. There, Bedi cleared several pending files and sanctioned 1,600 promotions in a single day to motivate the staff.

==== Campaign against drugs ====
In 1986, Bedi became DCP of Delhi's North District, where the primary problem was rampant drug abuse. At that time, Delhi had only one centre for treatment of drug addicts – Ashiana, which was run by the New Delhi Municipal Corporation. With help from her superiors, Bedi set up a detox center in one of the police premises. The center relied on community donations of furniture, blankets, medicines and other supplies. It also received voluntary services from doctors and yoga teachers. Within a year, five more detox centers were set up. Each center was intended to serve up to 30 patients, but at one time, each center catered to around 100 patients. The initiative was widely noticed, and Bedi travelled all over India, giving presentations and lectures on the programme. Before she was transferred to a new post, she and 15 other police officers institutionalized the detox centers as Navjyoti Police Foundation for Correction, De-addiction and Rehabilitation. Bedi served as the general secretary of the foundation.

==== Lawyers' strike ====
In the 1980s, Bedi attracted the ire of Delhi politicians and lawyers. First, she ordered lathi charge on a Bharatiya Janata Party (BJP) assembly in Red Fort area, and arrested its leaders. A few months later, she arrested Congress(I) MP J.P. Agarwal for violating curfew orders.

In January 1988, the Delhi Police caught a man stealing from a girl's purse at St. Stephen's College. A few weeks later, he was arrested again for trespassing into a women's toilet and writing obscene graffiti inside. One of Bedi's officers arrested and handcuffed the man. When he was produced in the court, he was recognized as Rajesh Agnihotri, a lawyer practicing at the Tis Hazari Courts Complex. The man had given a different name when he was arrested, and his lawyer colleagues claimed that he had been falsely framed. The protesters also argued that lawyers must not be handcuffed even if there are proper grounds for their arrest. Bedi vociferously defended her officer's action. The lawyers organized a strike and led a procession to DCP (North) office. Not finding DCP Bedi at the office, the lawyers manhandled Additional DCP Sandhu. This led to a scuffle between the cops and the lawyers. The lawyers escalated their strike, and several politicians supported the lawyers in demanding suspension of Bedi.

On 21 January, the police baton-charged the striking lawyers in Tis Hazari complex. This further enraged the lawyers. On 17 February, a mob of an estimated 600–1000 people led by the Congress corporator Rajesh Yadav arrived at Tis Hazari court. The mob was armed with brickbats, hockey sticks and small rods. It raised slogans in support of Bedi and Prime Minister Rajiv Gandhi. It stoned the lawyers' chambers and smashed the windscreens of their cars. The police force deployed in the area did not try to stop the mob violence, although some individual policemen tried to control the mob. Bedi denied any connivance in the incident. The police later arrested Rajesh Yadav, and charged him with rioting and conspiracy. The Congress distanced itself from Yadav and ousted him.

For the next two months, the lawyers stopped courts from functioning in Delhi and neighbouring states, demanding Bedi's resignation. The strike was called off after the Delhi High Court constituted a two-judge committee to investigate the matter. Known as Wadhwa Commission, the committee consisted of Justice DP Wadhwa and Justice NN Goswamy. KK Venugopal, the lawyers' counsel, produced evidence that on 17 February, all police stations in the zone knew that a 2000-strong mob was heading towards Tis Hazari Courts Complex, where the lawyers were on a hunger strike. Despite this, no police force was deputed to protect them. In its interim report, the Commission expressed concern over police lapses. The judges said that they wanted to investigate the matter further, and recommended transfer of five police officers (including Bedi) out of North Delhi, during the investigation period. Even before the report was made public, in April 1988, the Union Government transferred Bedi to the post of deputy director (Operations) in the Narcotics Control Bureau (NCB), also in Delhi. Two days later, the four other officers mentioned in the report were also transferred.

The members of the Delhi Bar Association were not satisfied with Bedi's transfer, and wanted her suspended. However, the Police Commissioner Ved Marwah refused to suspend Bedi. The commission's final report, released in April 1990, censured all the parties. The report stated that the arrest of Rajesh Agnihotri was justified, but his handcuffing was illegal. It also concluded that an "indiscriminate and unjustified" lathi-charge on the lawyers was ordered by Bedi, and that she had connived with the municipal councillor to organize the mob attack on the lawyers. The scholarly legal commentary was divided, with some supporting Bedi, citing her "unblemished" service record.

=== Mizoram ===
After Bedi was censured by the Wadhwa Commission, it was decided to transfer her out of Delhi. She wanted a challenging posting in either Andamans, Arunachal Pradesh or Mizoram. She hoped that this would lead to her reassignment to Delhi Police after a few years (after "hard" postings, government servants are unofficially entitled to a post they desire). She requested Joint Secretary (Union Territories) to transfer her to Mizoram, a remote border state in North-East India. When she didn't get any firm response, she wrote to the home secretary Naresh Kumar. Along with Bedi's batchmate Pardeep Singh, Naresh Kumar convinced the joint secretary to transfer her to Mizoram. They pointed out that officers who were given Mizoram posting refused to go there, while Bedi was volunteering to go there. Bedi reported to the Mizoram Government in Aizawl on 27 April 1990. Her designation was Deputy Inspector General (Range). Her parents and her daughter also moved to Mizoram.

Consumption of alcohol, especially home-brewed rice liquor Zu, was very common in Mizoram. Several of Bedi's officers were alcoholics. At first, she didn't stop them since Zu was a part of Mizo culture, and she didn't want to be seen as someone who interfered with the local culture. Later, she opened an indoor de-addiction facility for alcoholic policemen. The major crime in the district was heroin smuggling across the Burmese border. A number of teenagers were drug addicts, with proxyvon and heroin being the most common drugs. Most of the repeat criminal offenders were alcoholic. Since Mizoram was a Christian-majority state, Bedi utilized Christian prayers to reduce drug and alcohol-induced criminal behavior. She declared Saturdays "prayer and rehabilitation day" at district police stations, despite protests from the superintendent of police, who was an atheist. Every Saturday, past criminals would be brought to the police station to pray and learn and to receive treatment for alcoholism.

While in Mizoram, she completed a major part of her Ph.D. research. (Later, in September 1993, she was awarded a doctorate by IIT Delhi's Department of Social Sciences, for her thesis on Drug Abuse and Domestic Violence.) During her stay in Mizoram, she also started writing her autobiography.

In September 1992, her daughter Sukriti applied for a seat in Lady Hardinge Medical College (Delhi), under a quota for Mizoram residents. Students of Mizoram launched a violent agitation against the allocation, on the grounds that she was a non-Mizo. Sukriti had topped the merit list with 89% marks, and was given seat from the Central pool, according to the government guidelines. Mizoram's chief minister Lal Thanhawla asked her to surrender the seat in "the larger interests of the state", although he accepted that "there was nothing illegal in her daughter getting the seat". Bedi refused to surrender the seat, saying that her daughter deserved the seat.

As the protests turned violent, Bedi received threats that her house would be set on fire. Her superiors told her that they could no longer protect her. She left Aizawl after submitting her leave application. Her parents and daughter had already left for Delhi by this time. Lal Thanhawla accused her of insubordination.

=== As Delhi Prisons Inspector-General ===
After leaving her Mizoram assignment incomplete in September 1992, Bedi had to wait eight months for a new posting. In May 1993, she was posted to the Delhi Prisons as Inspector General (IG). The Tihar Jail of Delhi was built as a four-jail complex with a capacity of 2,500 prisoners. However, by the time Bedi became its in-charge, its prisoner population varied from 8,000 to 9,500. About 90% of its inmates were undertrials, who had been accused of non-bailable offences. Some of them had been waiting for years to get a trial in a badly clogged court system. The prison had a budget of ₹15 crore, which was just enough to pay for basic expenditure, leaving little for welfare programmes. Tihar was notorious as a violent and unmanageable place, and no officer wanted to be posted there. The post had been lying vacant for nine months, before Bedi was posted there.

==== Reforms at Tihar ====
Bedi decided to turn Tihar into a model prison. She introduced several reforms. She arranged separate barracks for the hardened criminals, who had been using their time in prison to recruit gang members, sell contraband and extort money. These prisoners unsuccessfully challenged Bedi in court for unfairly segregating them.

For other prisoners, Bedi arranged vocational training with certificates, so that they could find a job after their release. During her tenure, Indira Gandhi National Open University and National Open School set up their centers inside the prison. Legal cells were set up to help the undertrials. Bedi banned smoking in the prison. The move faced a lot of resistance from the staff as well as the prisoners. She introduced yoga and Vipassana meditation classes to change the prisoners' attitudes. She organized additional activities such as sports, prayer, and festival celebrations. She also established a de-addiction center, and pulled up or imprisoned the staff members involved in drug supply. A bank was also opened inside the prison. A bakery and small manufacturing units, including carpentry and weaving units, were set up in the jail. The profits from the products sold were put into the prisoners' welfare fund.

Bedi went on daily prison tours, observing the staff, listening to prisoners'complaints, inspecting food quality and evaluating overall management. She developed a panchayat system, where prisoners who were respected for their age, education, or character represented other inmates and met every evening with senior officers to sort out problems. She also established petition boxes so that prisoners could write to the IG about any issue. While the jail had suggestion boxes earlier too, the jail staff would destroy the complaints received through these boxes. On the other hand, the prisoners writing to Bedi received acknowledgment and information about the status of their petition.

In this prison reform programme, Bedi involved outsiders – including NGOs, schools, civilians and former inmates. As a result of Bedi's reforms, there was a drop in the fights and disturbances in the jail. Even the hardened criminals, who had been isolated in separate barracks, started behaving well. Bedi then arranged for them to attend education and meditation courses.

In May 1994, Bedi organized a 'health day', during which around 400 doctors and paramedics were invited to attend to Tihar's patients. Based on visits to two of Tihar's adolescent wards, a cardiologist associated with the Delhi Government's AIDS Control Programme, claimed that two-thirds of the inmates had acknowledged engaging in homosexual acts. He recommended distribution of condoms in the prison, a move supported by Delhi's Health Minister Harsh Vardhan and National AIDS Control Organisation. However, Kiran Bedi opposed the move pointing out that there were no HIV+ prisoners in Tihar. She stated that the distribution of condoms would encourage homosexual activity (illegal as per Section 377) among criminals. Based on a survey conducted through petition boxes, she claimed that incidence of consensual homosexual activity was negligible, and that the doctor's claim had hurt her prisoners. In response, the activist group ABVA filed a writ petition in the Delhi High Court demanding distribution of condoms in Tihar. Bedi termed the move as an attempt to force "western solutions" on "Tihar Ashram", and filed a counter affidavit opposing the demand.

==== Removal from Tihar ====
Bedi's reform programme at Tihar received worldwide acclaim. But it also attracted envy from her superiors, who accused her of diluting prison security for personal glory. She was not on good terms with her immediate supervisor in the government, the minister for prisons Harsharan Singh Balli. Many members of Balli's party, the BJP, had not forgiven Bedi for her lathi charge on the party's assembly in the 1980s. However, until March 1995, Bedi was on good terms with BJP's Delhi Chief Minister Madan Lal Khurana. Khurana was a prisoner in Tihar during the Emergency, and appreciated her work for prisoners.

In 1994, Bedi was awarded the Ramon Magsaysay Award and the Nehru Fellowship. The Magsaysay Foundation recognized her leadership and innovations in crime control, drug rehabilitation, and humane prison reform. The US president Bill Clinton invited her to National Prayer Breakfast in Washington, D.C. When the Delhi Government refused to let her accept the invitation, Bedi lobbied with the Union Home Ministry to get the clearance. However, the Home Minister S.B. Chavan declined the permission. Clinton repeated the invitation in 1995, and this time, Bedi approached the media. The New York Times published a report stating that "several politicians and her superiors were feeling cut up with her assertive style and the success that followed her". Under pressure from the public and the media, Chavan allowed Bedi to attend the Breakfast. However, this episode won her several detractors in the government.

Sometime later, Bedi was invited by the United Nations to discuss social reintegration of prisoners at the Copenhagen Social Summit. When the Delhi Government refused to permit her, Bedi met the minister of state for home Rajesh Pilot on 4 March 1995. The meeting got extended, because of which Bedi had to cancel an appointment she had with the Chief Minister Khurana. Pilot gave her the permission, but this irked Khurana, who later exclaimed "If she thinks we have no importance, then why does she want to work for the Delhi Government?" While Bedi was in Copenhagen, the prominent farmers' leader Mahendra Singh Tikait was imprisoned in Tihar after a rally, and sought the BJP leaders' help in getting a hookah inside. However, the jail authorities refused to give permission for a hookah, since Bedi had earlier declared Tihar a no-smoking zone.

Subsequently, Delhi's lieutenant governor P.K. Dave wrote a letter to the Union Home Secretary K. Padmanabhiah, accusing Bedi of "manipulating foreign trips", and leveled other charges against her. Dave accused Bedi of "compromising" the prison's security by allowing visitors – including American officials and foreign TV crews – inside the jail, without the Delhi government's permission. Another charge was that she had allowed NHRC representatives to meet TADA detainees from Kashmir, who had raised anti-national slogans. In her defence, Bedi argued that the TADA detainees had gone on a relay hunger strike demanding speedy trials. She also stated that the foreign TV crews had only shot the Vipassana meditation classes, and that she had the right to admit them under the rules. She also pointed out that the Union Government had itself asked her to allow the Americans – Lee P. Brown and Christine Wisner (wife of Frank G. Wisner) – inside the prison.

Another charge against Bedi was giving undue favours to the notorious criminal Charles Sobhraj. At that time, the Delhi Jail Manual (written in 1894 and modified in 1988) listed a number of prohibited articles, one of which was a typewriter. However, the manual also gave the jail superintendent the power to allow any of these prohibited items in special cases. Using this power, Bedi permitted Sobhraj the use of an electronic typewriter (Sobhraj had already been given a manual typewriter before Bedi became the officer in-charge). Bedi had also allowed NGOs to start typing classes for prisoners, but Sobhraj claimed that he was using the typewriter to write her biography, which gave the authorities a reason to accuse Bedi of misusing her powers. Khurana also alleged that Sobhraj had been supplied with a pipe and foreign-made cigars, a charge refuted by the testimony of Sobhraj's former cell-mate. The prison manual also had an antiquated rule which stated that "caught escapees will wear a red cap". Sobhraj had escaped in 1986, before he was recaptured. Khurana alleged that Bedi had specially exempted him from wearing a red cap. However, a senior jail officer stated that he had never seen the 'red cap' rule being implemented in Tihar. PK Dave and Madan Lal Khurana got Bedi removed as the prisons in-charge on 3 May 1995. When her transfer was announced, the Tihar inmates went on a hunger strike to protest it, while some of the warders celebrated it by distributing sweets. Bedi accused "unethical politicians" of "telling lies, making false allegations and misinforming people". She alleged that her supervisors in the government had no "interest, vision or leadership". She argued that she should not have been transferred on the basis of unverified charges, and demanded an inquiry committee. Rajesh Pilot defended her publicly, but the Union Government did not officially support her. Khushwant Singh described her transfer as "a victory for a handful of small-minded, envious people over a gutsy woman".

=== After Tihar ===
After her removal from Tihar, Bedi was posted as head of training at the police academy on 4 May 1995. Her designation was Additional Commissioner (policy and planning). She served as the Joint Commissioner of Police of Delhi Police. Later, she served as the Special Commissioner (Intelligence) of Delhi Police.

On 5 April 1999, she was appointed as Inspector-General of Police in Chandigarh. Her mother accompanied her, but soon suffered a stroke and went into coma. Bedi requested a transfer back to Delhi, where her family would be able to take care of her mother. The Union Ministry of Home Affairs transferred her back to Delhi on 15 May. However, her mother died in Delhi three days later, after having been in coma for 41 days.

In 2003, Bedi became the first woman to be appointed the United Nations civilian police adviser. She worked in the Department of Peacekeeping Operations. In 2005, she returned to Delhi after her UN stint. The Delhi Bar Association lobbied to ensure that she didn't get a post that would put her on track to become Delhi's police chief. The lawyers, referring to the 1988 controversy, wrote to government authorities arguing that Bedi's appointment to a top post might "unnecessarily create a conflict between the legal fraternity and the police". She was made the director general, Home Guards. Before her retirement, she was serving as the director general of the Bureau of Police Research and Development.

In 2007, Bedi applied for the post of Delhi Police Commissioner. She was overlooked in favour of Yudhvir Singh Dadwal, who was junior to her, reportedly because the senior bureaucrats saw her as too "outspoken and radical". Bedi alleged bias, and stated that her merit had been overlooked. She also proceeded for a three-month 'protest leave', but canceled it later. Journalists like Karan Thapar and Pankaj Vohra criticized her for crying bias, and stated that her service record was tainted with controversies like incomplete Goa, Mizoram and Chandigarh assignments; the lawyers' strike controversy; and the removal from Tihar.

Bedi resigned from police service in November 2007, citing personal reasons. She stated that she wanted to focus on academic and social work.

== Social activism ==
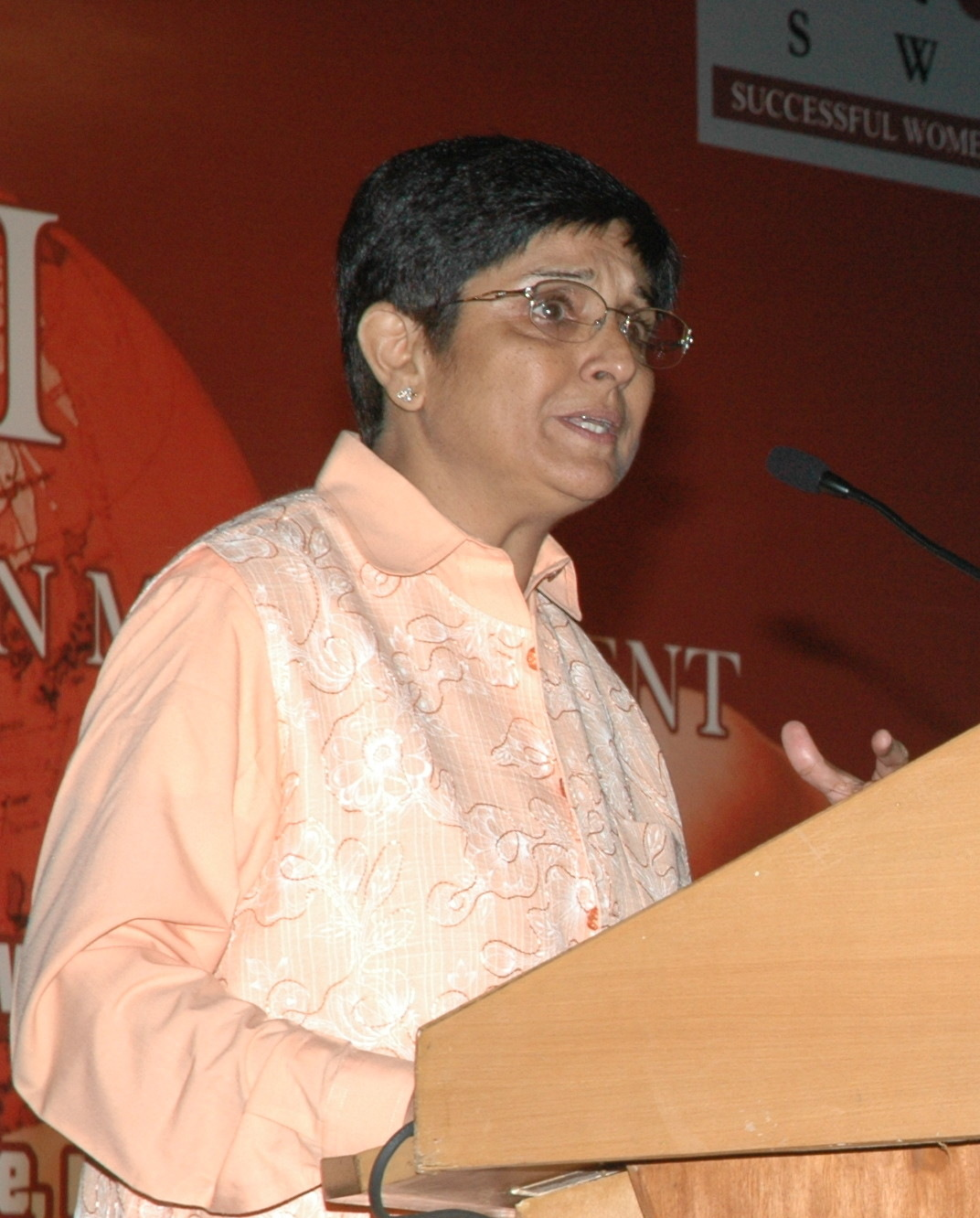
Bedi at Successful Women in Management (SWIM) Conference in 2009

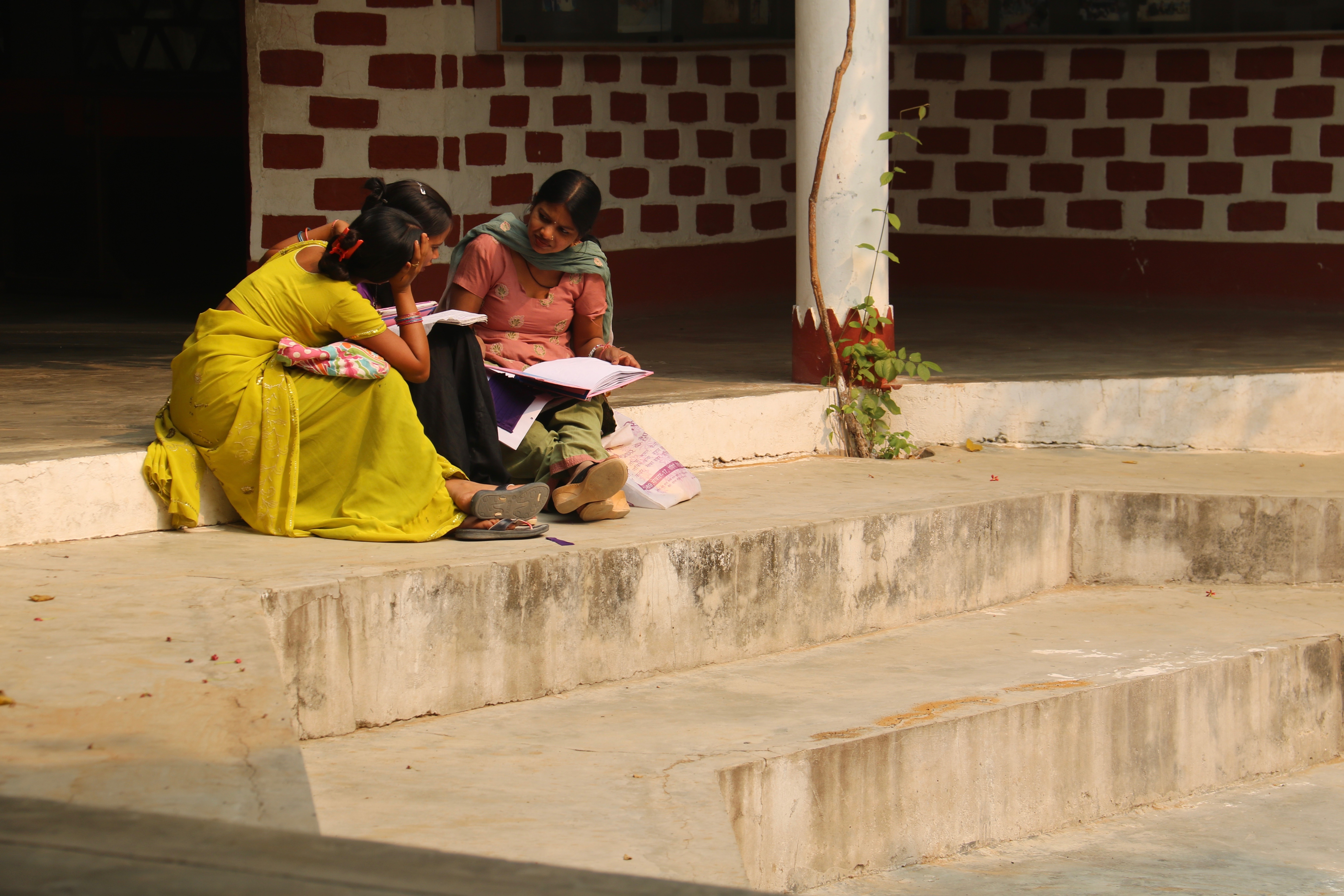
Group of women in the Navjyoti India Foundation

The Navjyoti Delhi Police Foundation founded by Bedi and her colleagues was renamed to Navjyoti India Foundation in 2007. Over the next 25 years, it provided residential treatment to nearly 20,000 drug and alcohol addicts. It also started crime prevention programmes such as education of street children and slum kids. It established 200 single-teacher schools, vocational training centers, health care facilities and counselling centers for the vulnerable sections of society. In 2010, it also established the Navjyoti Community College, affiliated to IGNOU.

Bedi set up India Vision Foundation (IVF) in 1994. IVF works in fields of police reforms, prison reforms, women empowerment and rural and community development. In police reform area, Bedi emphasized better training, while opposing hazing of trainees. She opposed frequent transfers, stating that these lead to poor cadre management. She also proposed creation of a new level of police administration, which would protect rank-and-file officers from politicians and bureaucrats. In women's rights area, she has advocated equitable educational opportunities and property ownership (including co-ownership) for women. She has emphasized faster empowerment of rural women.

She is a social commentator and trainer and frequently speaks on various social issues like education, domestic violence & others. During 2008–11, Bedi hosted the reality TV show Aap Ki Kachehri on STAR Plus. In this court show, Bedi resolved everyday conflicts in a simulated courtroom. In 2008, she launched the website to help people whose complaints are not accepted by the local police. As an activist for women's safety across the nation, Bedi heavily slammed former Samajwadi Party chief Mulayam Singh Yadav for his comments of "Boys are boys, they make mistakes, why hand them for rape" during the 2014 General Elections.

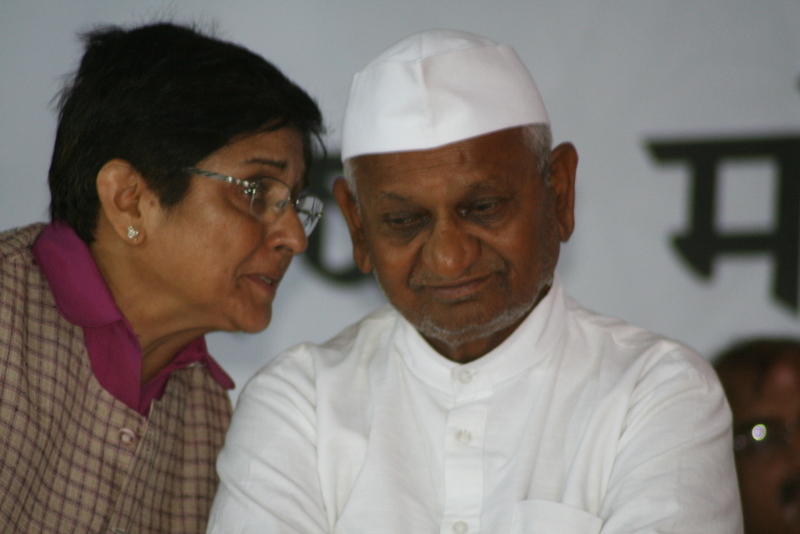
Kiran Bedi with Anna Hazare.

Bedi was one of the speakers in Bhagavad Gita Summit (from 10–14 December 2021) during Gita Jayanti at Dallas, Texas, US along with other notable personalities such as Swami Mukundananda Ji, Dr. Menas Kafatos, Mr. Shiv Khera, Brahmacharini Gloria Arieira and others.

=== Anti-corruption movement ===
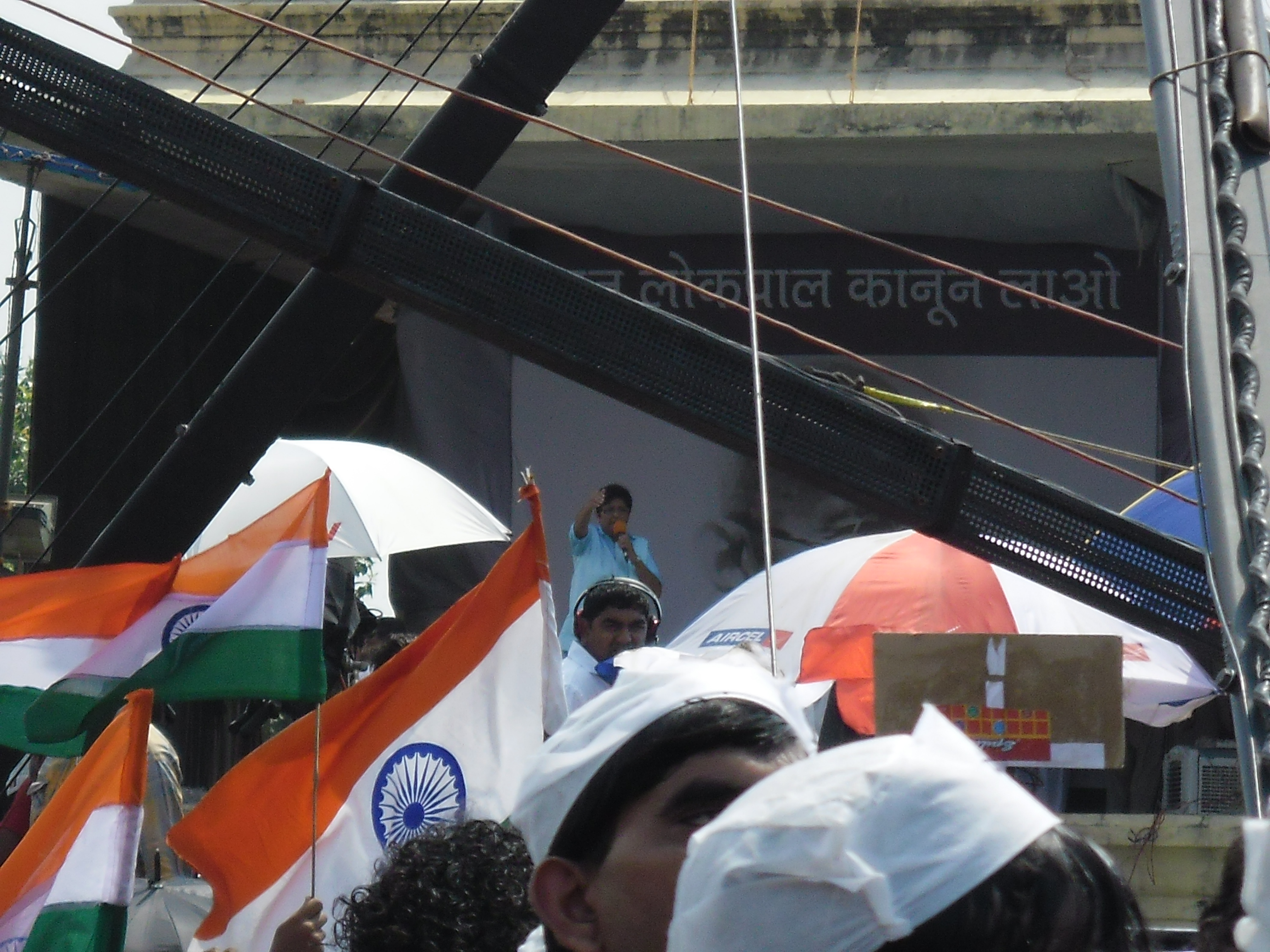
Kiran Bedi at Ramlila maidan for Jan Lokpal Bill.

In October 2010, Arvind Kejriwal invited Bedi to join him in exposing the CWG scam. Bedi accepted the invitation, and by 2011, the two had allied with other activists, including Anna Hazare, to form India Against Corruption (IAC) group. Their campaign evolved into the 2011 Indian anti-corruption movement. Anna Hazare planned an indefinite hunger strike to demand the passage of a stronger Jan Lokpal Bill in the Indian Parliament. On 16 August 2011, Bedi and other key members of IAC were detained by the police, four hours before the hunger strike could start. Bedi and other activists were released later on the same day. After twelve days of protests and many discussions between the government and the activists, the Parliament passed a resolution to consider three points in drafting of Lokpal bill.

Some members of parliament proposed to bring a breach of privilege motion against Bedi and other activists for allegedly mocking the parliamentarians during the Lokpal bill protests, however they withdrew these notices later.

During the anti-corruption movement, Bedi faced controversy when some newspapers questioned discrepancies in her past travel expenses between 2006 and 2011. In 2009, for example, Bedi was invited as the keynote speaker at a conference arranged by Aviation Industry Employees Guild. She accepted the invitation without a speaking fee, but her NGO was to be reimbursed for travel expenses. Bedi's travel agent Flywell, invoiced her hosts business class fare for air tickets, but arranged Bedi to travel in economy class. Between 2006 and 2011, there were several discrepancies in travel-related expense statements, as well as instances where she travelled at no cost to her hosts for a cause. In these cases, Bedi stated she did not personally receive or incur the disputed difference, only India Vision Foundation did, an NGO she headed. In November 2011, the Delhi Police, under directions of the additional chief metropolitan magistrate, registered an FIR – police case for cognizable offense – against Bedi for allegedly misappropriating funds through Indian Vision Foundation and other NGOs. The investigation that followed found no evidence of fraud against her or of siphoning of NGO funds for personal use, and subsequently filed closure of the case.

== Politics ==
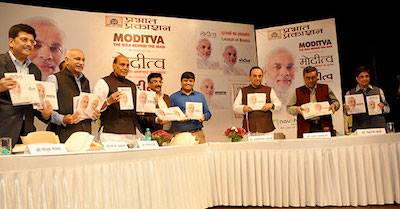
Bedi (right) at the launch of a book on Narendra Modi in March 2014

Bedi split from IAC after a faction led by Arvind Kejriwal formed the Aam Aadmi Party (AAP) in 2012. AAP went on to form a short-lived minority government in Delhi with Kejriwal as chief minister. During the 2014 Indian general election, Bedi publicly supported Narendra Modi, the prime ministerial candidate of Bharatiya Janata Party (BJP). Kejriwal, on the other hand, contested the election against Modi. After Modi won and became the prime minister of India, Bedi stated that she was ready to be BJP's CM candidate in Delhi, if such an offer was made to her. Eight months after Modi's election, she joined BJP in 2015. She was BJP's chief ministerial candidate for the 2015 Delhi Assembly elections, in which Arvind Kejriwal was AAP's CM candidate. She lost the election from Krishna Nagar constituency to AAP candidate SK Bagga by a margin of 2277 votes, and AAP came to power again with an absolute majority after one year.

Earlier, on 22 May 2016, Bedi was appointed as the lieutenant governor of Puducherry.

== Lieutenant Governor of Puducherry ==
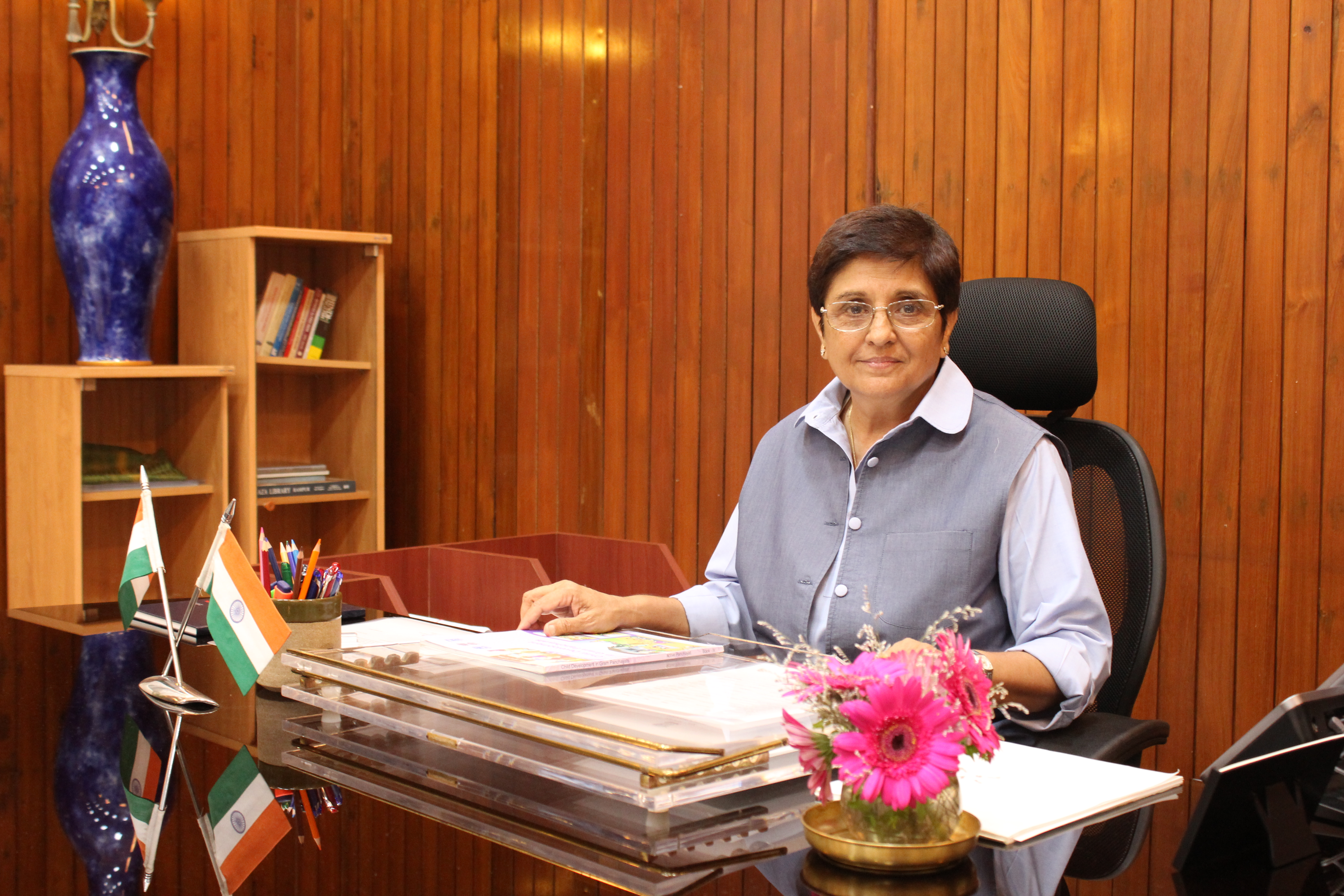
Bedi as Lt. Governor of Puducherry

Bedi took oath as the Lieutenant Governor of Puducherry on 29 May 2016, stating that she was aiming to make Puducherry prosperous through "trust, empowerment and accountability."

One of the first practices she initiated as the lieutenant governor was to open the gates of Raj Nivas - the official residence of the Governor - to the public, thereby making it the "People’s Nivas". She started an 'open house' process where the public could visit Raj Nivas from Monday to Wednesday at 17:00 to meet the lieutenant governor in person and have their grievances addressed. She undertook morning rounds on bicycle to inspect public amenities and interact with people.

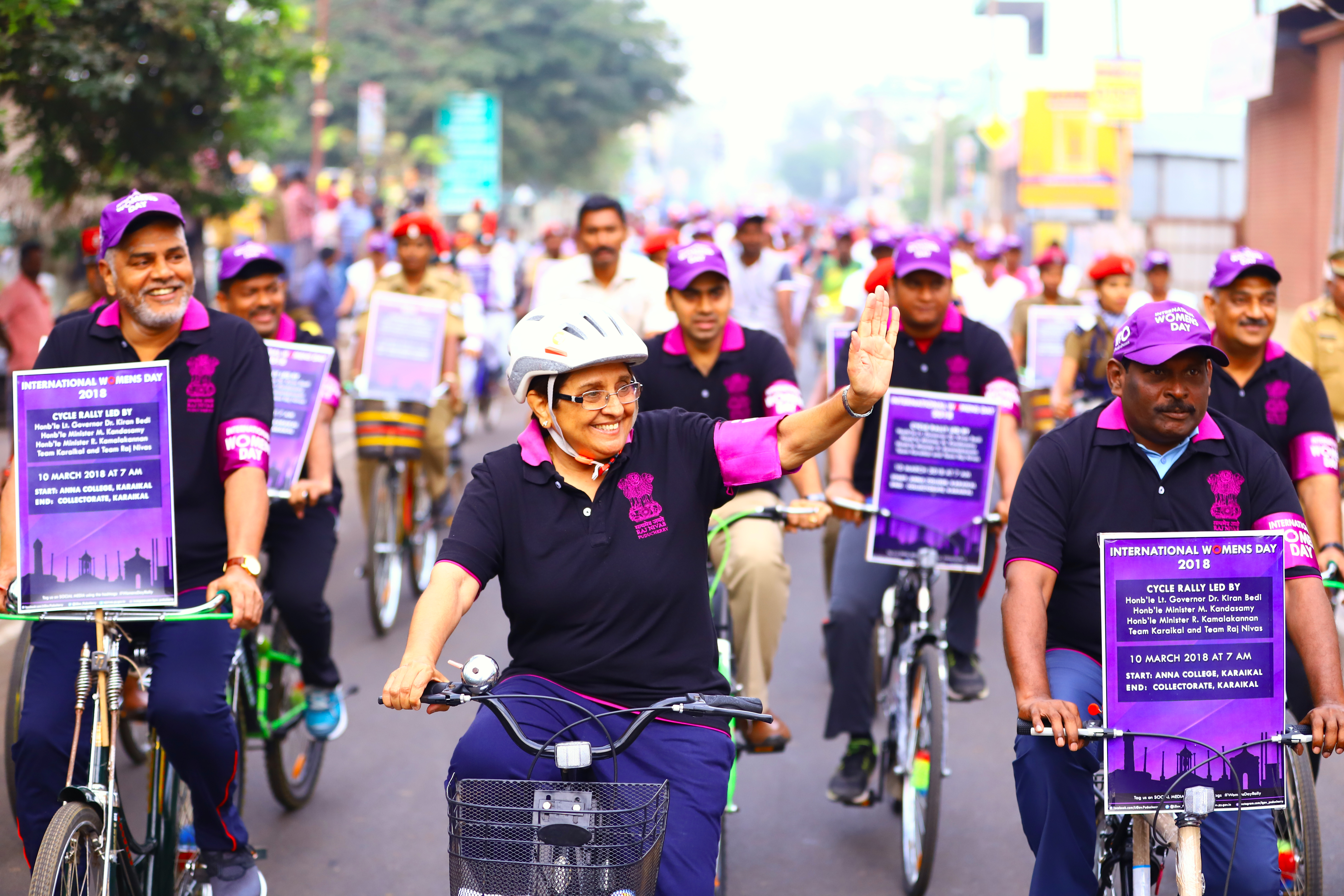
Bedi leading a cycle rally at Karaikal.

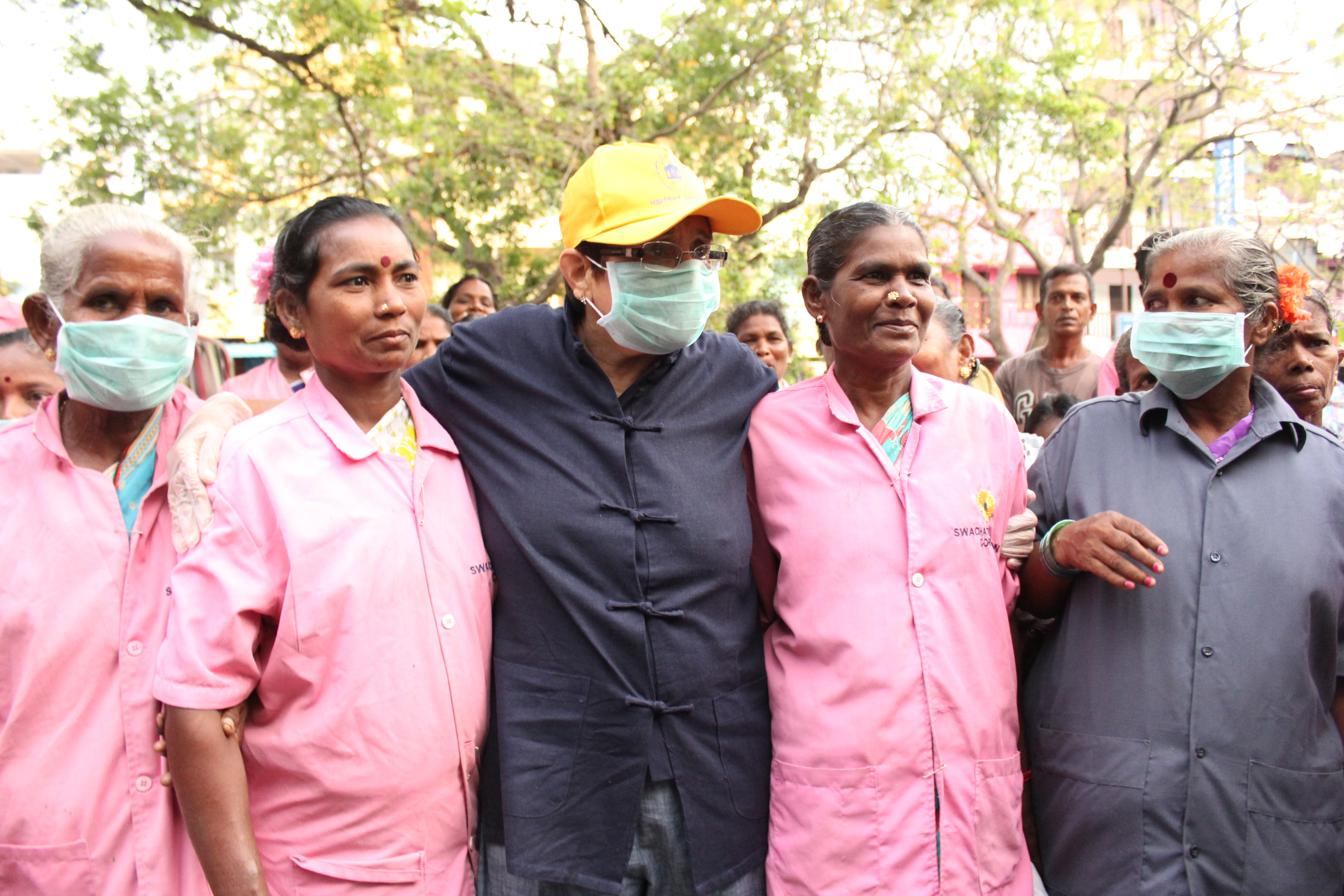
Bedi with Sanitation Workers during a cleaning campaign at Puducherry

Raj Nivas dedicated "visitor hours" every day from 12:00 to 13:30, during which the general public was allowed to enter and see the French heritage building and to meet the lieutenant governor, and take a picture with her.

In 2017, Bedi received public complaints about corrupt practices in postgraduate medical college admissions process organized by the Centralized Admission Committee (CENTAC), a government body. She visited the CENTAC office, and directed the officials to revoke their decision of surrendering government-quota seats to the managements of private colleges. She also ordered them to ensure fairness and transparency in the process. Some private colleges had denied admissions to government-quota students stating that the fees prescribed by CENTAC was too low. Bedi directed the management of these colleges to admit the students, and asked them to take up the issue of low fees with the government.

Another project by Bedi has been ‘Mission Water Rich Puducherry’. When she heard that the PWD did not have enough funds to de-silt water channels and the drains, she brought in community support in the form of CSR, connected donors with JCB machine contractors, and had the channels de-silted in short notice. Today, this model is being emulated across the country. In 2019, as she celebrated her 70th birthday, she began 'Mission Green Puducherry' by planting saplings along the Kanagan lake in Puducherry. Since then, many students and volunteers have taken this forward by organizing tree planting drives.

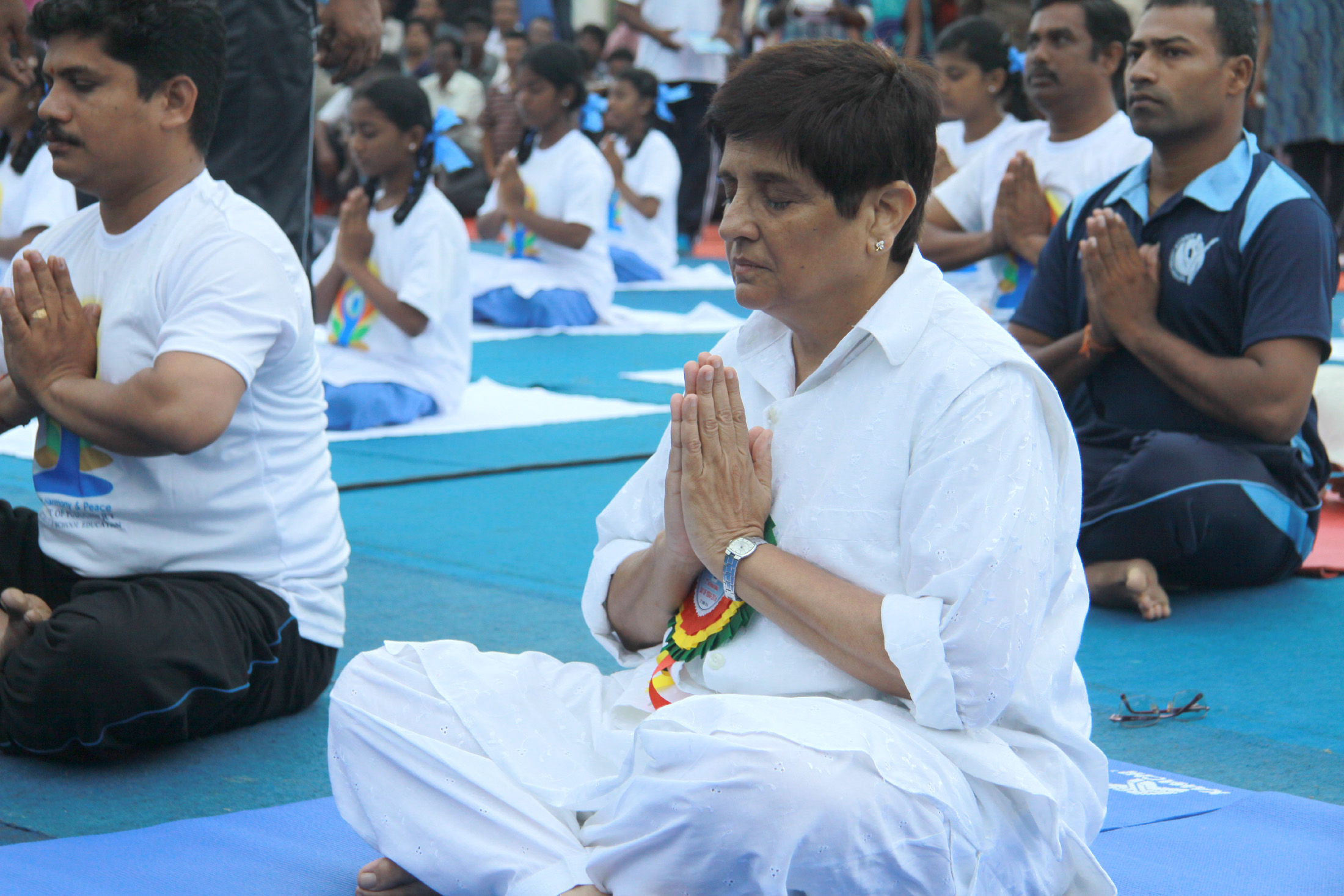
Bedi performing Yoga along with other participants, on the occasion of the 2nd International Day of Yoga – 2016, at Beach Road, Puducherry on June 21, 2016

At the 50th Governors Conference in Delhi, Bedi outlined several best practices that she introduced in Puducherry to ensure financial prudence, bring in community support, and grievance redressal through open house.

She removed as the lieutenant governor of Puducherry on 16 February 2021. The governor of Telangana, Tamilisai Soundararajan was given additional charge of the Union territory.

== Author ==
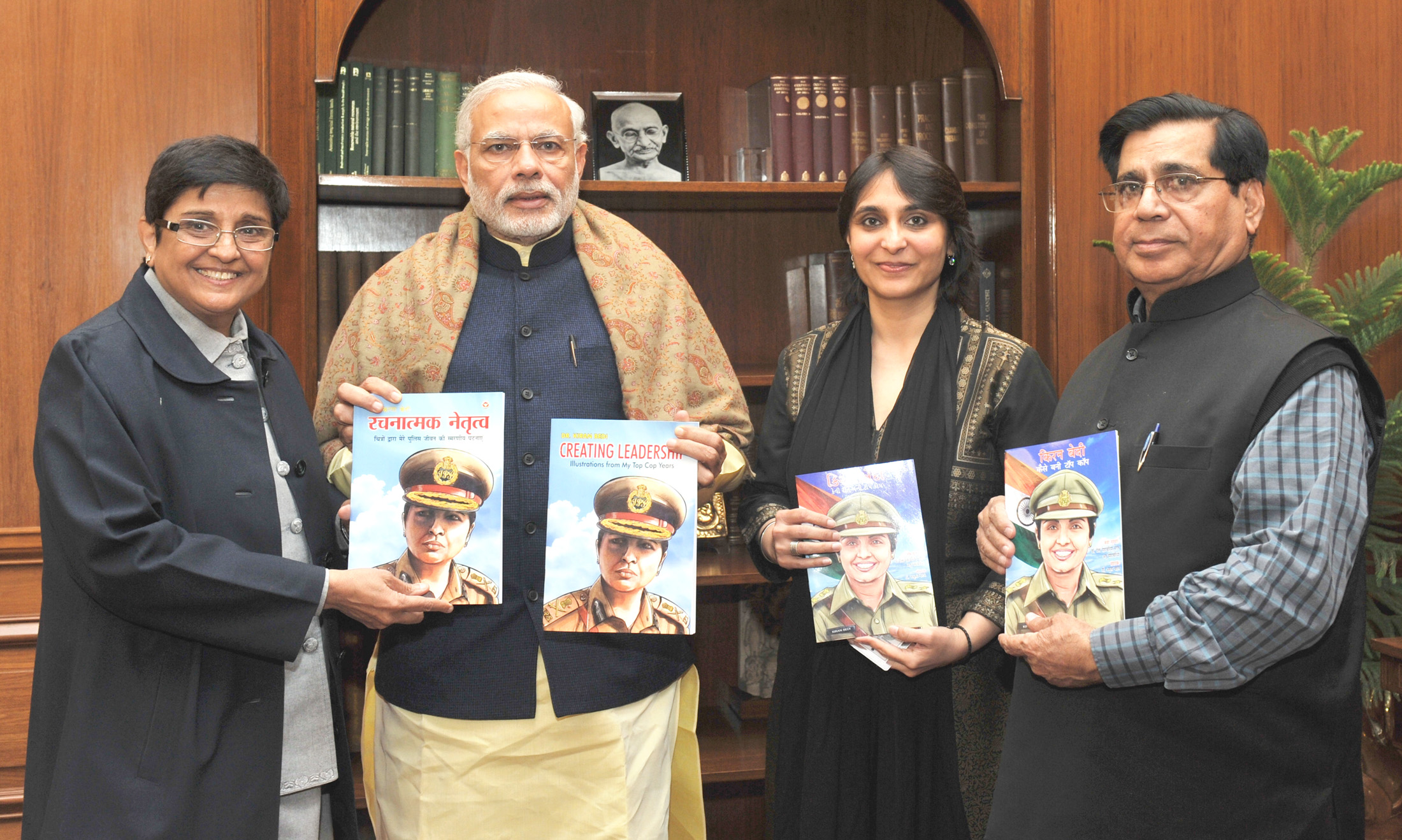
Kiran Bedi presents her book "Creating Leadership" to the prime minister, Narendra Modi, in New Delhi on January 13, 2016

Bedi has authored the following works:

- Kiran Bedi (1985). Demand for Swaraj: (1905–1930). ABS.
- Kiran Bedi (2006). It's Always Possible: One Woman's Transformation of Tihar Prison. Himalayan Institute Press. ISBN 978-0-89389-258-6.
  - Translated into Marathi as इट्स ऑलवेज पॉसिबल (ISBN 8177663534)
- Kiran Bedi; Parminder Jeet Singh; Sandeep Srivastava (2001). Government @ Net: New Governance Opportunities for India. SAGE. ISBN 978-0-7619-9569-2.
- Kiran Bedi (2003). As I see. Sterling. ISBN 978-81-207-2938-4.
- Kiran Bedi; T M Dak (1 January 2005). What Went Wrong?…….And Continues. UBSPD. ISBN 978-81-7476-444-7.
  - Translated into Marathi by Leena Sohoni as व्हॉट वेंट रॉंग? (ISBN 8177664700)
- Kiran Bedi (2006). It's Always Possible: One Woman's Transformation of Tihar Prison. Himalayan Institute Press. ISBN 978-0-89389-258-6.
- Kiran Bedi (2006). Galti Kiski (in Hindi). Diamond. ISBN 978-81-7182-899-9.
- Kiran Bedi (2006). Yeha Sambhav Hai (in Hindi). Diamond. ISBN 978-81-288-0466-3.
- Kiran Bedi (2008). Empowering Women… As I See… by Kiran Bedi. Sterling. ISBN 978-81-207-9126-8.
  - Translated into Marathi by Madhuri Shanbhag as अ‍ॅज आय सी… स्त्रियांचे सक्षमीकरण… (ISBN 8177664875)
- Kiran Bedi (2008). Leadership & Governance… As I See… by Kiran Bedi. Sterling. ISBN 978-81-207-9168-8.
  - Translated into Marathi by Madhuri Shanbhag as ऍज आय सी… नेतृत्व आणि प्रशासन… (ISBN 8177664875)
- Kiran Bedi (2008). Indian Police… As I See…. Sterling. ISBN 978-81-207-3790-7.
  - Translated into Marathi by Madhuri Shanbhag as अॅज आय सी… भारतीय पोलीस सेवा… (ISBN 8177664875)
- Kiran Bedi; Pavan Choudary (2010). Broom & Groom. Wisdom Village. ISBN 978-93-80710-01-3.
  - Translated into Hindi as कायदे के फायदे (ISBN 9789380710037)
  - Translated into Marathi as कायदे नेक फायदे अनेक (ISBN 9789380710044)
  - Translated into Gujarati as આવો આપણે સભ્યતા કેળવીએ (ISBN 9789380710051)
- Kiran Bedi. Be the Change: Fighting Corruption. Sterling. p. 2012. ISBN 978-81-207-9174-9.
- Kiran Bedi (2012). Dare to Do, for the New Generation. Wisdom Village. ISBN 9789381431436.
  - Translated into Hindi as निडर बनो (ISBN 9789380710341)
- Kiran Bedi; Pavan Choudary (2013). Uprising 2011: Indians Against Corruption. Wisdom Village Publications. ISBN 978-93-80710-44-0.
- Kiran Bedi;(2016). Dr. Kiran Bedi : Creating Leadership.. Diamond Books Publications ISBN 978 93 51659-78-5
- Kiran Bedi (2016). Himmat Hai Kiran Bedi Diamond Books Publication. ISBN 978-81-7182-991-0
- Shivani Arora (2020). Where Kindness Spoke: Best Practices of a Lieutenant Governor Dr. Kiran Bedi Through Her Leadership. Sterling Publishers Pvt. Limited. ISBN 9788194400714.
- Kiran Bedi (12 January 2022). Fearless Governance. Diamond Pocket Books Pvt Ltd. ISBN 978-9354866029.

== Personal life ==
Kiran Bedi was born Kiran Peshawaria, daughter of Prakash Lal Peshawaria and his wife Prem Lata Peshawaria. She is one of four sisters. Indian-American lawyer Anu Peshawaria is Bedi's younger sister.

Kiran met her future husband Brij Bedi on the tennis courts of Amritsar. Brij, who was nine years older than her, played university-level tennis at the time. On 9 March 1972, the two were married at a simple ceremony at the local Shiva temple. The couple had a happy marriage initially, and Brij Bedi was extremely supportive of his wife's aspirations. In an interview given after she became the first woman to be accepted into the ultra-elite IPS, Kiran Bedi described her husband as "my personal God" and attributed her success to him. However, once she had become the first-ever IPS officer, Kiran Bedi's parents moved into the government house allotted to her and also brought along their two youngest (unmarried) daughters. Brij and Kiran had a daughter three years after the wedding, but after her birth, Brij Bedi's parents and siblings were hardly able to see the baby due to the total domination of Kiran's family in the household. Brij Bedi felt suffocated and relations with his live-in in-laws deteriorated. He moved out not long after the birth of his daughter and thereafter, the two lived separately for the rest of their lives. However, they never got divorced, and Brij Bedi has attributed that decision to the fact that they have a child together.

The couple had a daughter in 1975; originally named Sukriti, she later changed her name to Saina. Brij Bedi died on 31 January 2016.

== Awards and recognitions ==
Year	Award	By	For	Source
1968	Cadet Officer Award	National Cadet Corps	Performance as an NCC cadet	
1979	President's Police Medal for Gallantry	President of India	Conspicuous courage in preventing violence during Akali-Nirankari clashes	
1991	Asia Region Award	International Organization of Good Templars, Norway	Drug prevention and control	
1994	Ramon Magsaysay Award	Ramon Magsaysay Award Foundation, Philippines	Government service	
1995	Fr Maschio Humanitarian Award	Fr Maschio Platinum Jubilee Celebration Committee, Don Bosco Matunga	Social reforms and community services	
1995	Lion of the Year	Lions Club, KK Nagar	Community service	
1997	Joseph Beuys Prize	Joseph Beuys Foundation, Germany	Holistic and Innovative Management (Prison reform)	
1999	Pride of India	American Federation of Muslims of Indian Origin (AFMI)	Commitment towards human welfare	
1999–2000	IIT Delhi Alumni Award	Indian Institute of Technology – Delhi Alumni Association	Outstanding Contribution to National Development	
2001	Morrison Tom Gitchoff Award	Western Society of Criminology, United States	Actions that have significantly improved the quality of justice in India	
2004	United Nations Medal	United Nations	Outstanding service	
2005	Mother Teresa Memorial National Award for Social Justice	All India Christian Council	Reforms in prison and penal systems	
2006	Most Admired Woman in the Country	The Week		
2008	FICCI Award of Excellence	FICCI Ladies Organisation	Being an outstanding woman achiever	
2008	Kumarappa-Reckless Award	Indian Society of Criminology	Outstanding contribution in the areas of criminal justice administration	
2013	Nomura Award	Nomura Group	Humanitarian work	
2014	L’Oreal Paris Femina Women Award	L'Oréal and Femina	Social impact	

In 2005, CUNY School of Law awarded her an honorary Doctor of Law degree in recognition of her "humanitarian approach to prison reforms and policing".

The Navjyoti Delhi Police Foundation received the 1999 Serge Sotiroff Memorial Award for outstanding contributions to international drug control efforts.

She was conferred with Acharya Tulsi Kartritva Puraskar in 2005 by Akhil Bhartiya Terapanth Mahila Mandal.

== In popular culture ==
The following films, documentaries and TV programmes are based on Bedi's life:

- Karthavyam (1990), is a Telugu film based on Bedi. It was dubbed into Tamil as Vyjayanthi IPS. The movie was remade in Hindi as Tejaswini.
- Doing time, Doing Vipassana (1997), documents Bedi's initiatives for the practice of Vipassana meditation at Tihar
- I Gandhis fotspor / In Gandhi's Footsteps: Kiran Bedi's Humanitarian Revolution (2004), a documentary by the Norwegian filmmaker Oystein Rakkenes. Awarded Best Documentary at the Indo-American Film Festival in Atlanta in 2006.
- Kiran Bedi: Yes Madam, Sir (2008), a documentary produced by Australian filmmaker Megan Doneman. Narrated by Helen Mirren it was filmed over a six-year period and premiered in 2009. It was adjudged the "Best Documentary" at the Santa Barbara International Film Festival.
- Kannadadda Kiran Bedi (2009) is a Kannada film, starring Malashri as a fictionalized interpretation of Bedi.
- Koi To Ho Ardhnarishwar, a television series aired from 2010 on DD National. It was an adaptation of a novel by Vishnu Prabhakar, the novel in turn took its inspiration from Bedi's life.
- Carve Your Destiny, a 2014 film directed by Anubhav Srivastava, features Bedi.

Biographies of Bedi include:

- Parmesh Dangwal (1996). Panjabi di daler dhi: Kiran Bedi (in Punjabi). Abhishek.
- Meenakshi Saxena (2000). Kiran Bedi, the Kindly Baton. Books India International. p. 232.
- Parmesh Dangwal (2004). I Dare!: Kiran Bedi: a Biography. UBS. ISBN 978-81-7476-483-6.
  - Translated into Sinhalese as Parmesh Dangwal (2004). Man baya nâ. Samayavardhana Pothala. ISBN 978-955-570-325-3.
- Siddharth Iyer (2012). Kiran Bedi: The Woman of Substance. Diamond. ISBN 978-93-5083-669-9.
- Reeta Peshawaria Menon; Anu Peshawaria (2014). Kiran Bedi – Making of Top Cop. Diamond. ISBN 9789351654988. Archived from the original on 22 January 2015.. A 32-page comic book biography authored by Kiran Bedi's sisters Reeta and Anu

Kiran Bedi was featured in National Geographic's Series "Mega Icons" (2018), which revolves around her life.

Government offices
Preceded by A. K. Singh	28th Lieutenant Governor of Puducherry; 2016–2021	Succeeded by Tamilisai Soundararajan; Additional Charge
Police appointments
Preceded by	Director General of Bureau of Police Research and Development; 2005–2007	Succeeded by
Preceded by	Director General of Civil Defence & Fire Services; 2005–2005	Succeeded by
Preceded by	Special Commissioner (Intelligence) of Delhi Police	Succeeded by
Diplomatic posts
Preceded by	Police Adviser and Director of United Nations Police; 2003–2005	Succeeded by
