= Shiv Khera =

Indian author, activist, and motivational speaker

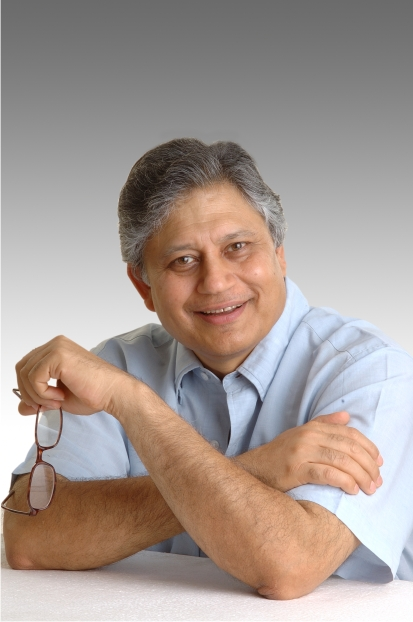
- Khera in January 2016
- Born: 13 November 1949 (age 76); Dhanbad, Jharkhand, India
- Education: (BCom hons) Shri Ram College of Commerce Delhi University
- Occupations: Author, motivational speaker
- Website: shivkhera.com

Shiv Khera is an Indian author, activist and motivational speaker, best known for his book, You Can Win. He launched a movement against caste-based reservation in India, founded an organization called Country First Foundation.

== Early life ==
Khera was born in a business-oriented family that operated coal mines, which were eventually nationalized by the Indian government. He completed BCom hons from Shri Ram College of Commerce of Delhi University. In his early years, he worked as a car washer, a life insurance agent, and a franchise operator before becoming a motivational speaker. While working in Toronto, he was inspired by a lecture delivered by Norman Vincent Peale and claims to follow Peale's motivational teachings.

When Freedom Is Not Free was published, Amrit Lal, a retired Indian civil servant, accused Khera of plagiarism, alleging that content from that book directly came from his own book India Enough Is Enough, published 8 years earlier. Additionally, he found that numerous anecdotes, jokes and quotes in Khera's other books were also used without acknowledging proper sources. Khera countered that he took notes and inspirations from numerous sources, and that he was unable to keep track of all of them. Lal finally accepted an out-of-court settlement for an undisclosed sum of money (reputed to be 25 lakh according to Khera), which he said he would donate to the Missionaries of Charity.

== Activism and politics ==
Khera founded Country First Foundation, a social activism organisation whose mission is "to ensure freedom through education and justice". In 2004, he stood as an independent candidate from the South Delhi constituency in Indian general elections and "lost". In 2008, he started the Bharatiya Rashtravadi Samanata Party. During 2014 polls in India, he supported the Bharatiya Janata Party and campaigned for Lal Krishna Advani, a senior member of the party. Khera has also filed several public interest lawsuits in the Indian Supreme Court.

Shiv Khera was one of the speakers in Bhagavad Gita Summit (from 10–14 December 2021) during Gita Jayanti at Dallas, Texas, US along with other notable personalities such as Swami Mukundananda Ji, Dr. Menas Kafatos, Kiran Bedi, Brahmacharini Gloria Arieira and others.

== Works ==
- You Can Win: Winners don't do different things. They do things differently.
- You Can Achieve More: Live By Design, Not By Default
- You Can Sell: Results are Rewarded, Efforts Aren't

== See also ==
- List of Indian writers
