= Giuseppe Moja =

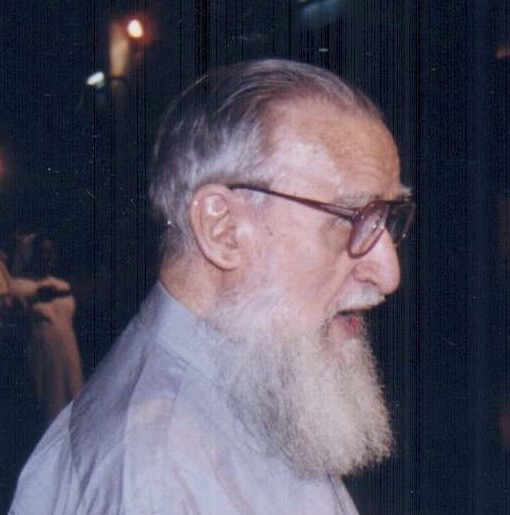
Photo of Giuseppe Moja (1915-2009), Salesian of Don Bosco, missionary in India

Giuseppe Moja (20 December 1915, Orino, Lombardy - 26 May 2009) was a Salesian priest and missionary in India. He is part of the group of pioneers who began the Salesian work in Panjim, Goa, including the Don Bosco High School, Panjim. He also pioneered the Salesian work in Sulcorna, Goa, where there is now a substantial farm and the Don Bosco High School, Sulcorna.

== Early life ==
Born to Tranquillo and Elisa Clivio in 1915, the young Giuseppe followed his family to Verdun, France, in 1922 for reasons of work. Here he picked up French, a language that he cultivated throughout his life, being able even in old age to recite whole poems by heart.

In 1928, at the age of 13, he entered the seminary at Como. From here he went to the Salesian seminary at Ivrea, where he found himself immediately at home. He reports having said to his Rector after barely a few days there: "Here, with Don Bosco, I have found my place."

== In India ==
Moja left for India in 1932. He entered the Salesian novitiate at Shillong and made his first profession on 7 December 1933. He was soon appointed secretary to Fr Vincenzo Scuderi, who was the Provincial as well as Apostolic Administrator of the diocese of Krishnagar. He made his final profession at Sonada on 6 January 1941.

As an Italian national, Moja was interned by the British Government during World War II, first at Deoli and then at Dehradun. In the camp at Dehradun, together with other Salesians, he completed his theological studies and was ordained priest on 8 December 1944.

== Goa ==
Expelled from British India as "undesirable", Moja, together with others, chiefly Vincenzo Scuderi, went to Portuguese Goa in 1946. He thus became one of the pioneers of the Salesian work in Goa. The Salesians began their work at Panjim, where Fr Scuderi began an 'oratory' (a sort of youth centre), a Portuguese medium school, an English medium high school, and a technical school, all in 1946, practically in the year he arrived. Soon there were four 'oratories' - Panjim, Campal, Fontainhas, and Calangute. Fr Moja was the first headmaster of the English school, which began with a little over 200 students. The English school was granted recognition by the University of Bombay in June 1948.

Moja worked in Panjim from 1946 to 1962, when he was transferred to Sulcorna, to begin the Salesian work in this remote outback of the southern Goa jungles, in a large property donated by Humberto Mascarenhas. Here, among other things, with the assistance of confreres like Brother Ludvik Zabret, he cleared part of the forest to establish a farm growing sugarcane, cashew, and other cash crops. He also began the production of the Goan country liquor called cashew feni (distilled from the cashew apple); this is still being produced and has a reputation in Goa for its strength and taste. Today Don Bosco Sulcorna, situated on some 200 acres (0.81 km^{2}) of lush land, is a complex work comprising a farm, a school, a hostel for boys, an agricultural college, and social work in the surrounding villages. The Salesian Sisters (FMA) also have a hostel for girls nearby.

== Lonavla, Pune and Mumbai ==
In 1977 Moja was transferred out of Goa, after a period of 31 years. He was assigned to Don Bosco Lonavla as confessor to the boys, and then, after some years, to Don Bosco Youth Centre, Koregaon Park, Pune, as administrator. In 1985 he was appointed assistant parish priest at St Dominic Savio Church, Wadala East, Mumbai. In 1988 he was assigned to the Salesian Provincial House, Matunga, Mumbai, where he remained for about 20 years. Here he took over as Editor of Don Bosco's Madonna, the magazine started by Fr Aurelius Maschio that is perhaps the Christian magazine with the largest circulation in India, now reaching almost 1,00,000 subscribers.

Moja was honoured by the Italian Government with the title Cavaliere della Repubblica for his services in India.

== Back in Italy ==
In 2007 Moja returned to his native Italy, for reasons of health, having spent some 71 years in India. After some months in his native village of Orino, he was admitted to the Casa Don Quadrio, the infirmary of the Salesian Province of Lombardo-Emilia (ILE) at Arese. He died here at the age of 93, and was buried at Orino on 28 May 2009.

Bernard Britto, secretary to the provincial and close friend, called Moja "an artist, poet, musician, preacher, linguist, writer, editor, physician, technician, farmer, builder, hunter". Another confrere described him as "a great Salesian".

== Bibliography ==
=== Primary ===
- Giuseppe Moja. "How Wonderful Thy Ways O Lord! - An Eye-witness Account of the First Salesian Presence in Goa." The Memory of the Salesian Province of Bombay 1928-1998, ed. Peter Gonsalves (Matunga, Bombay: Province Information Office, Don Bosco Provincial House, 1998) 37-54.
- Giuseppe Moja, translator. Teresio Bosco, Don Bosco: A New Biography. Mumbai: Tej-prasarini, Don Bosco Communications, 2005, 2006.

=== Secondary ===
- Joseph Thekkedath, SDB. A History of the Salesians of Don Bosco in India: from the beginning up to 1951-52, vols. 1 and 2. Bangalore: Kristu Jyoti Publications, 2005.
- "'Don Bosco Moved Me to Tears'. Fr Giuseppe Moja, SDB (1915-2009), with contributions from Frs Ivo Coelho and Bernard Britto." Don Bosco's Madonna 11/10 (February 2010) 7.
- Padre Giuseppe Moja: 'A great Salesian'. Per 70 anni missionario in India. [Mortuary Letter, Casa Don Quadrio, Arese, Italy, 2009]. 24 pp.
- Ivo Coelho, "Fr Giuseppe Moja." SDB West 27/1 (June–July 2009) 13-15.
- Michael Mascarenhas. Battle-ready in our Boots: Sulcorna - Fifty Golden Years. 1962-2012 and beyond.... Odxel (Goa): Boskon Communications Center, [2018].
