= World Sanskrit Day =

Celebration day for Sanskrit language

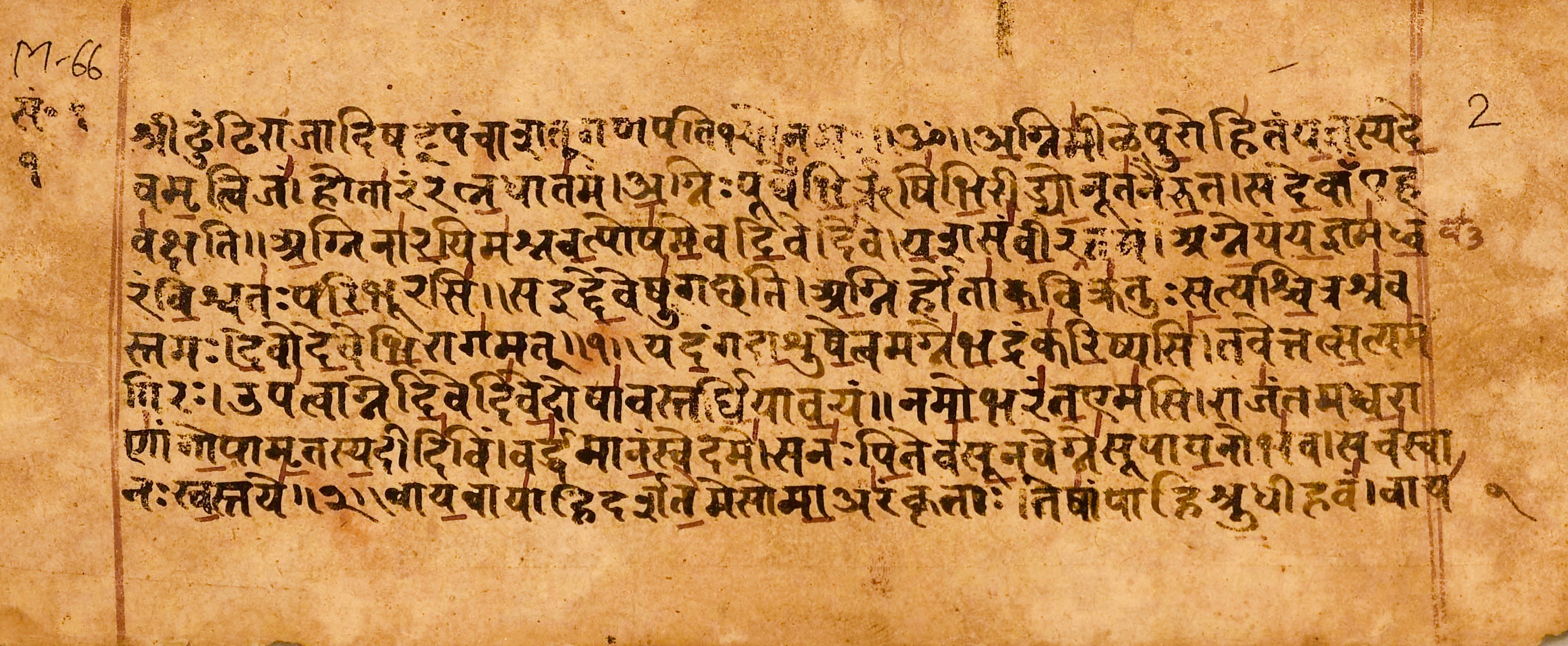
The Vedas, written in Sanskrit

World Sanskrit Day, also known as Vishva-Samskrita-Divas (Sanskrit: विश्वसंस्कृतदिवस, romanized: Viśvasaṃskṛtadivas), is an annual event focused around the ancient Indian language Sanskrit that incorporates lectures about the language and is aimed to promote its revival and maintenance. It is celebrated on Shraavana Poornima, that is the full moon day of the Shraavana month in the Hindu calendar. This generally corresponds with the month of August in the Gregorian calendar. The Sanskrit organisation Samskrita Bharati is involved in promoting the day.

Shraavana Poornima, i.e. Raksha Bandhan, is considered to be the festival of remembrance and worship of sages and worship for their dedication. In Vedic literature it was called Shravani. On this day, before the study of Vedas in Gurukulas, Yajñopavita - sacred thread - is worn. This ceremony is called Upanayana or Upakarma Sanskar. The old Yajñopavita is also changed on this day. Priests also tie raksha-sutras to the hosts. Rishis are considered the original source of Sanskrit literature, hence Shravani Purnima is celebrated as Rishi Parv and World Sanskrit Day. This day was chosen because the academic year in ancient India started on this day. On this day, students started the study of Vedas in the gurukulas. From the full moon of the month of Paush to the full moon of the month of Shraavana, the studies are stopped to learn other Vedantic scriptures. This tradition is still unbroken in modern Vedic schools. The World Vedic Day is on 11 July.

In 1969, the Ministry of Education of Government of India issued instructions to celebrate Sanskrit Day at the Central and State levels. Since then, Sanskrit Day is celebrated all over India. On this occasion, Sanskrit Kavi Sammelan, writer's seminar, students' speeches and verse recitation competition etc. are organized, through which Sanskrit students, poets and writers get a proper platform.

== See also ==
- Sanskrit revival
