= Aurelius Maschio =

Aurelius Maschio, priest member of the Society of St Francis de Sales (Salesians of Don Bosco), missionary in India, pioneer of the Salesian work in Mumbai, founder of Don Bosco High School (Matunga), was born to Giuseppe Maschio and Orsolina Della Cia on 12 February 1909 at Vazzola, Treviso, Italy. He is considered the patriarch of the Salesian Province of Mumbai. He died on 9 September 1996 at Mumbai.

== Early life ==
Aurelius was the sixth of eleven children, in a family famous for its winery (Maschio wines).Cantine Maschio At the age of 10 he expressed his desire to be a priest; his parents sent him to the Don Bosco Institute at Sampierdarena, Genoa. After four years, he was sent to the aspirantate of Penango, in October 1923.

== Missionary in India ==
In October 1924 he asked to be sent to the missions. He joined the missionary expedition at the Salesian Mother House, Turin, in 1923. He was only 15. On 2 November 1924 he set sail from Venice to Bombay. Landing in Bombay 15 days later, he and his companions boarded the train for Calcutta and then for Gauhati. He began his novitiate in Shillong towards the end of 1924. On 25 December 1925 he made his first profession. During his philosophical studies, he began to learn Khasi, and did so well that he was entrusted with the editing of the local religious magazine, Ka Ling Kristan. Aurelius did his practical training at Don Bosco Technical School, Shillong, and then began his theological studies, in 1930. He was ordained a priest by Msgr. Ferdinand Perrier, Archbishop of Calcutta, on 29 April 1933. He was just 24 years old.

His first appointment was in Cherrapunjee, together with Fr Mlekus. When Fr Mlekus died a few months later of exhaustion, at the age of 31, young Aurelius was entrusted with the responsibility for the mission. He soon bought a plot of land, rebuilt the residence, and bought another plot where he settled the Salesian Sisters. He showed himself a good organiser and fund raiser.

== Pioneer in Mumbai ==
The Salesian work in Mumbai had begun in 1928, with Fr Joseph Hauber and Fr Adolph Tornquist. They had been entrusted with the Mary Immaculate Institute, a small school and boarding for poor Goan boys at Tardeo. When Fr Tornquist fell ill, the provincial, Fr Eligio Cinato, asked the 27-year-old Fr Maschio to take his place. Fr Maschio came to Tardeo on 20 February 1937. Almost immediately he began proceedings to buy a plot of land on the outskirts of the city near King's Circle (now Maheswari Udyan) at Matunga. The sale was approved by the municipality on 16 July 1938. When, in 1940, the Salesians had to quit Tardeo Castle, they moved temporarily to Cumballa Hill. In 1941 work began on the construction of the first building on the newly acquired property at Matunga. By 31 October 1941, the Don Bosco School and boarding shifted to Matunga. When the Bombay dock explosion occurred in April 1944, Fr Maschio was quick to take advantage of the situation, by applying to take the debris to Matunga. The excellent playground of Don Bosco High School (Matunga) is due to this initiative and foresight. The second block of the school building was commenced in 1949 and completed in 1952.

Already in his first year in Mumbai, Fr Maschio began publishing a folder entitled Don Bosco's Madonna. This is now a monthly religious magazine with a circulation of almost 100,000 in India and elsewhere. Fr Maschio is also the builder of the Shrine of Don Bosco's Madonna at Matunga, which is an Italianate church modelled in some way on the Basilica of Our Lady Help of Christians, Turin, built by St John Bosco.

Fr Maschio and the other Italian Salesians in Mumbai were not interned by the British government during World War II, as happened with Italian Salesians in other parts of India. They were merely asked not to leave Bombay Island without permission, report to the police commissioner every Thursday, etc.

In 1953, after a rectorship of 16 years, Maschio was replaced by Fr Mauro Casarotti. He continued, however, as Rector of the Shrine, running the Shrine Office through which he continued to obtain funds for the rapidly expanding works of the Salesians in and around Mumbai. Among his friends and benefactors, he could count J.R.D. Tata. In 1972, the new Salesian Province of Mumbai was formed, with Fr Dennis Duarte as its first provincial. In 1970 the Italian government conferred on him the Knighthood of the Italian Republic, and in 1973 the title of Commendatore. The European Community also recognized him as head of a non-governmental organization, and entrusted him with the distribution of food to worthy social projects.

Fr Maschio died in Mumbai on 9 September 1996. He is buried in the Shrine of Don Bosco's Madonna that he built.

== Fr Maschio Humanitarian Award ==
In 1993 a lay group of volunteers formed the Diamond Jubilee Committee, and instituted the "Fr Maschio Humanitarian Award" for humanitarian achievements. In 1995, the 12th such award was given to Ms Kiran Bedi. Among other recipients of the award are Mother Teresa, Baba Amte, Archbishop Thomas Menamparampil of the Roman Catholic Archdiocese of Guwahati, Gladys Staines (1999), Julio Ribeiro (Indian police officer) (2000), and Gram Mangal (2003).

== Maschio Memorial Foundation ==
In 1997, the Maschio Memorial Foundation was established at the headquarters of the Salesian Province of Mumbai at Don Bosco, Matunga. The Foundation strives to continue the work of Fr Maschio by strengthening the participation of the young and the poor in their own development. It is committed to facilitate projects that provide care, training and other support systems for the poor and the young.

== Bibliography ==
- Alessi, Antonio M. Love without Frontiers: Fr Aurelio Maschio, Salesian Missionary. Matunga: Shrine of Don Bosco's Madonna, 1983.
- Casti, Joseph. "Fr. Aurelius Maschio." The Memory of the Salesian Province of Bombay 1928-1998. Ed. Peter Gonsalves (Matunga, Bombay: Province Information Office, Don Bosco Provincial House, 1998) 57-59.
- T[hekkedath] J. Joseph. "The Starting and Consolidation of the First Salesian Work in Bombay (1928-1950). The Memory of the Salesian Province of Bombay 1928-1998. Ed. Peter Gonsalves (Matunga, Bombay: Province Information Office, Don Bosco Provincial House, 1998) 6-36.
- Thekkedath, Joseph. A History of the Salesians of Don Bosco in India from the beginning up to 1951-42. (Bangalore: Kristu Jyoti Publications, 2005). 2 vols. See esp. vol. 1, ch. 11: The First Salesian House in Bombay (Mumbai).
