= Gloria Arieira =

Sanskrit scholar and teacher

Gloria Arieira (also known as Brahmacharini Gloria Arieira) is a Brazilian Sanskrit scholar and Vedanta teacher. She was awarded the Padma Shri, India's fourth highest civilian award in 2020. She founded Vidya Mandir Centro de Estudos de Vedanta e Sânscrito in Copacabana, Rio de Janeiro, Brazil which teaches Advaita Vedanta and Sanskrit in Portuguese language.
