= Roerich =

Roerich is a surname. Notable people with the surname include:

- Nicholas Roerich (1874–1947), Russian painter, writer, archaeologist and theosophist
- Helena Roerich (1879–1955), Russian philosopher, writer and public figure, wife of Nicholas Roerich
- George de Roerich (born Yuri Roerich) (1902–1960), Russian Tibetologist, son of Nicholas Roerich
- Svetoslav Roerich (1904–1993), Russian painter, son of Nicholas Roerich

== See also ==
- Röhrich
- 4426 Roerich, a main-belt asteroid
- Nicholas Roerich Museum, a museum in New York City dedicated to the works of Nicholas Roerich
- Roerich Pact, an international treaty on the protection of artistic and scientific institutions and historic monuments
- Rerikhism, a spiritual and cultural movement centered on the teachings transmitted by Helena and Nicholas Roerich
- Hans Roericht (1932–2025), German designer
