= Ian Kwakye =

Ghanaian visual and street artist

Ian Kwaku Adomako-Kwakye
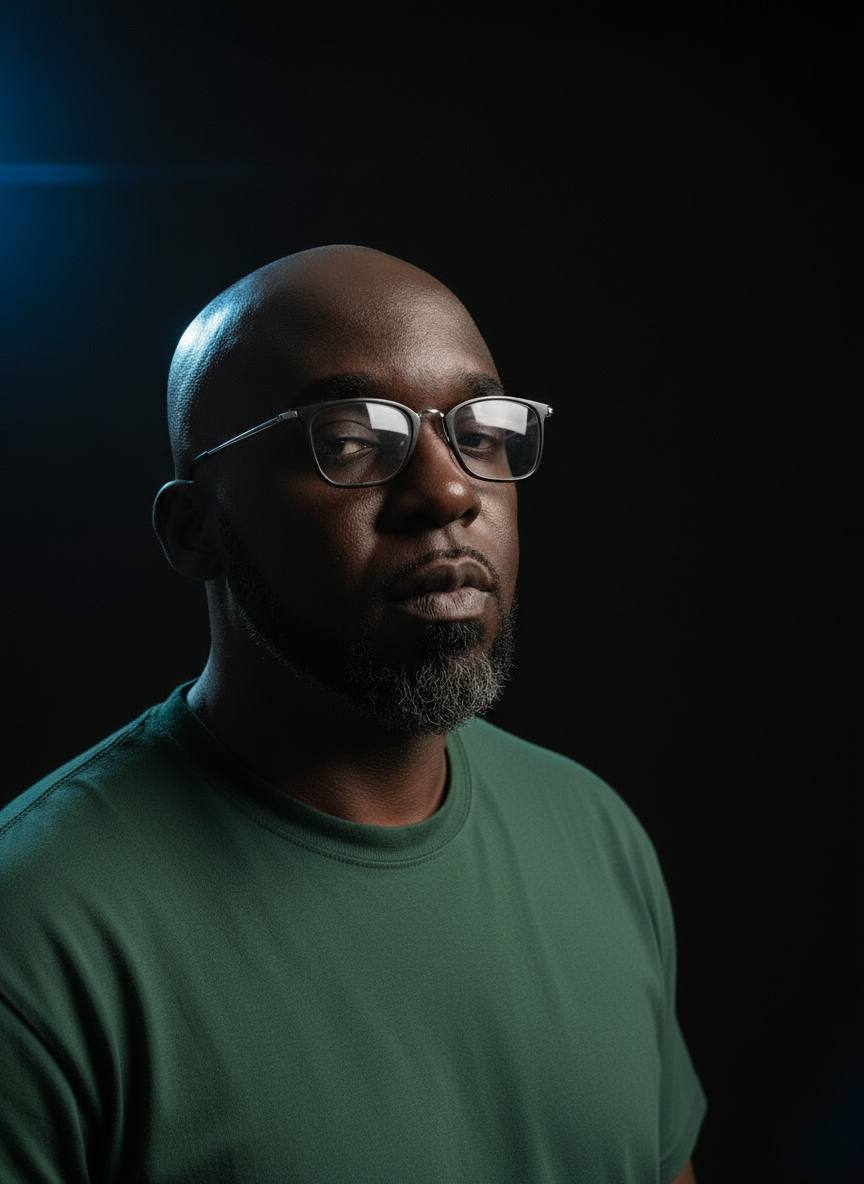
- Ian Kwakye at an exhibition
- Occupations: Visual artist, graffiti artist

Ian Kwaku Adomako-Kwakye, known as Ian Kwakye, is a Ghanaian visual artist whose work includes digital art, graffiti, mural projects, and public art exhibitions in Ghana. His work has been featured in contemporary art shows, community-based mural initiatives, and environmental street-art campaigns.

== Career ==
Kwakye has participated in several public art projects and exhibitions covered by Ghanaian media. He was involved in a digital art exhibition titled My Nose is Bleeding held at the W.E.B. Du Bois Centre in Accra.

He participated in an exhibition organized in partnership between the Kuenyehia Trust for Contemporary Art and the European Union Delegation to Ghana.

Kwakye was also present at an International Migrants Day event coordinated by IOM Ghana and partner organizations.

== Exhibitions ==
A photo exhibition of Kwakye's work was held at the Imposters Art Gallery.

== Public and Environmental Art ==
Kwakye has contributed to public mural initiatives. He was among artists who worked on mural projects to brighten paediatric hospital wards in Ghana.

He also participated in environmental art campaigns connected to World Art Day, where street and graffiti artists promoted environmental protection.
