= Universal Day of Culture =

Annual observance promoting the Roerich Pact

Pax Cultura symbol; emblem of the Banner of Peace

The Universal Day of Culture under the Banner of Peace, known also as the World Day of Culture, is an observance held annually on April 15 in many countries around the world to promote the protection of culture, the Roerich Pact and the Banner of Peace.

== History ==
The Universal Day of Culture was proposed by the author of the Roerich Pact—the Russian artist Nicholas Roerich. In several articles and letters, written in 1931–1935, he spoke about the Universal Day of Culture. In his "Greetings to the Bruges Conference in 1931" Roerich defined the Universal Day of Culture as a day which "shall be consecrated to the full appreciation of all national and universal treasures of culture". According to Roerich, the celebrations had to take place in all schools and educational institutions. In 1933, in his "Prayer for Peace and Culture" Roerich includes also the churches into this list and specifies that on this day "the world will be reminded of the true treasures of humanity, of creative heroic enthusiasm, of improvement and enhancement of life." On April 15, 1935, when the Roerich Pact was signed in Washington, Roerich mentioned this date as "memorable day" and "significant date", which later led to consideration of April 15 as the Universal Day of Culture.

== International movement ==
The International Movement for the affirmation of April 15 as Universal Day of Culture (IMAUDC) was established in December 2008 by NGOs from Cuba, Italy, Lithuania, Latvia, Russia and Spain. As of 2014, 40 organizations from 14 countries and 25,000 individuals participate in the Movement.

=== Lithuania ===
Lithuania is the first country in which the Universal Day of Culture is celebrated on government level since 2006. On November 24, 2007 the 26th session of the Baltic Assembly adopted a Resolution, initiated by Lithuania, in which the Assembly proposed to the governments of Latvia, Lithuania and Estonia to proclaim April 15 as Day of Culture of the Baltic states. At the celebrations in 2009 the minister of defense of Lithuania Rasa Juknevičienė, the minister of culture Remigijus Vilkaitis, ambassador of Day of Culture at Council of the Commission about the Culture of the Union of the Baltic Cities Aukse Narvilene appeared with salutatory addresses. In her address to the Banner of Peace hoisting ceremony to mark the Universal Day of Culture in 2011 the Speaker of Seimas of Lithuania Mrs. Irena Degutienė said that this is a day, on which "people are exchanging ideas on the fundamental values, raising and addressing fundamental questions, and the word "culture" is uttered more often than usual." She specified culture "not only as the artistic and creative heritage passed on from generation to generation, but also as our level of communication, capacity of building bridges of tolerance, and the level of trust in others who have different views and profess different faith."

In 2012, during Universal Day of Culture celebrations, three Lithuanian towns - Dubingiai, Rietavas and Ylakiai - were proclaimed as towns of peace, where priority of culture is implemented in all aspects of public life.

=== Russia ===
In Russia the Universal Day of Culture is supported by of numerous institutions and organizations, including the Moscow State University of Geodesy and Cartography, the Moscow State University of Culture and Arts, The Nicholas Roerich Estate Museum in Izvara, The Union of Artists of Russia, local branches of the International League for the Protection of Culture, etc. Celebrations are held annually in Moscow, St. Petersburg, Ekaterinburg, Irkutsk and Berezniki. Notable Russian politicians and public figures are members of the Council of the International Movement. The members of the Russian Duma Elena Drapeko and Nikolay Rastorguyev, and the cosmonaut Aleksandr Balandin are among them. The Association of Space Explorers in Russia also supported the Universal Day of Culture.

=== Brazil ===
In Brazil the celebrations are organized annually by Brazilian Roerich Institute, which was established in 1999. On April 15, 2010, the 75th anniversary of the Roerich Pact, the panel "Protection and Preservation of natural treasures: the challenges to the servers of culture" was held in São Paulo. The Banner of Peace has been hoisted as well.

=== Canada ===
In Canada the Universal Day of Culture is celebrated in Edmonton, Alberta since 2012. They are organized by the Alberta Banner of Peace Association, with the participation of Alberta Interscience Association and Edmonton Theosophical Society in different years.

=== United States ===
In the United States of America, the Universal Day of Culture has been observed since 2023 by an annual celebration in Savannah, Tennessee. The event includes meetings with representatives from countries all around the globe, cultural performances, authentic food and craft vendors, and a parade.

=== Philippines ===
In 2024 Central Mindanao Colleges in Kidapawan City joined in the commemoration of the Universal Day of Culture, stating that "Beyond mere observance, this event stands as a testament to the multifaceted richness of global cultural diversity".

=== Romania ===
In Romania, the observance of the Universal Day of Culture started in 2024, with a celebration at the National Museum of Romanian Literature, attended by official representatives from the embassies of Argentina, Cuba, Greece, Mexico and Norway, and from the Liszt Institute.

=== Other countries ===
The Universal Day of Culture is celebrated also in Argentina, Bulgaria, Belarus, Chile, Cuba, Israel, Italy, Latvia, Mexico and Spain.

== See also ==
- World Art Day
