= Rarick =

Rarick is a surname of German origin, and an Americanized spelling of Röhrich. People with this name include:

- Cindy Rarick (born 1959), American golfer
- Jason Rarick (born 1969), American politician
- John Rarick (1924–2009), American lawyer and judge
- Phillip J. Rarick (born 1940), American judge
