= Svetoslav Roerich =

Russian-Indian painter (1904–1993)

- Святослав Рерих
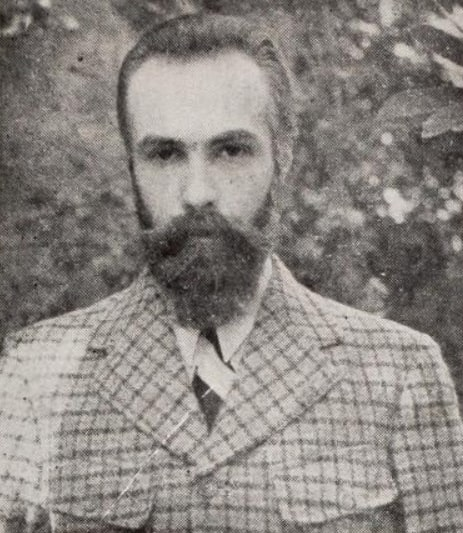
- Roerich in 1945
- Born: 23 October 1904; Saint Petersburg, Russia
- Died: 30 January 1993 (aged 88); Bangalore, Karnataka, India
- Resting place: Bangalore, Karnataka, India
- Citizenship: Russia (1904–1917); Stateless (1917–1960); India (1960–1993)
- Education: Columbia University; Harvard University
- Spouse: Devika Rani (m. 1945)
- Parents: Nicholas Roerich (father); Helena Roerich (mother)
- Relatives: George de Roerich (brother)

Signature
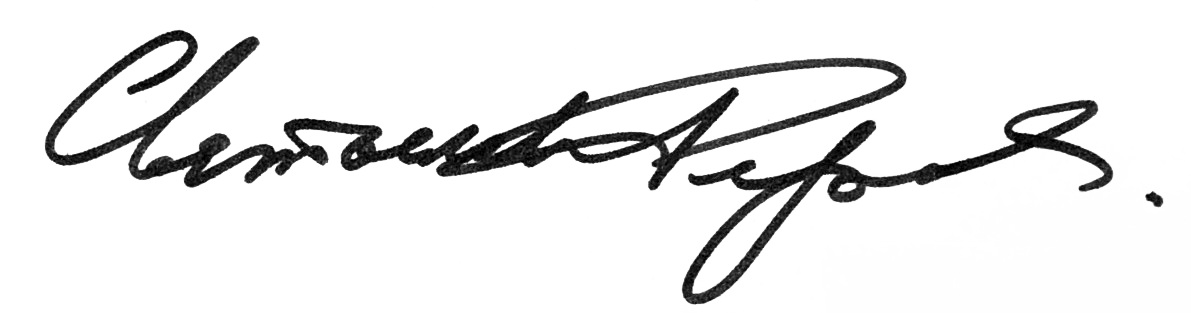

Svetoslav Nikolayevich Roerich^{α} (Russian: Святослав Николаевич Рерих; 1904–1993) was a Russian and Indian painter. Born in Saint Petersburg, he was later based in India.

== Early life and education ==
Roerich was born on the 23 October 1904 in Saint Petersburg to Helena Roerich and Nicholas Roerich.

Roerich studied from a young age under his father's tutelage. Between 1918–1920, Roerich studied in England. In 1920, Roerich entered Columbia University and studied architecture. Roerich graduated from Harvard University's School of Architecture.

== Biography ==
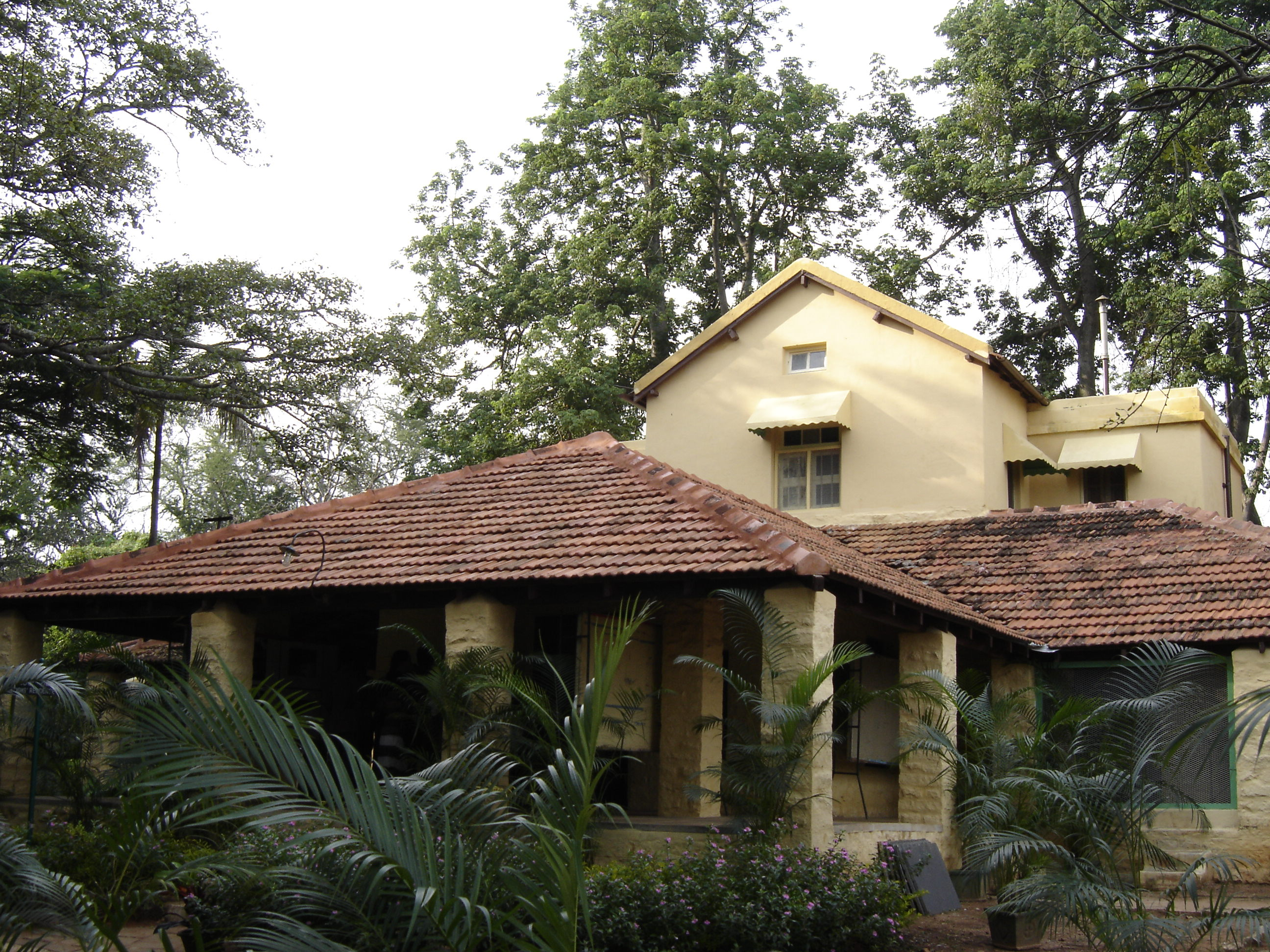
Residence of Svetoslav Roerich, Bangalore

He won the Grand Prix of the Sesquicentennial Exposition in Philadelphia in 1926. He lived for many years in India where Jawaharlal Nehru awarded him the International Award and the Padma Bhushan. His paintings of Nehru and Indira Gandhi, adorn the historic Central Parliament Hall in New Delhi. He was married in 1945 to an Indian movie star Devika Rani, who was once married to producer Himanshu Rai and known as "The First Lady of the Indian Screen". Roerich was born a citizen of the Russian Empire, but became stateless after the Bolshevik Revolution. Resident in India since the 1930s, Roerich became an Indian citizen on 21 March 1960. Roerich died in 1993 at the age of 88 and is buried in Bangalore, India.

He was named an Honorary Academician of the Art Academy of the USSR, and was an honorary member of the Bulgarian Academy of Art.

He had a large plantation on the outskirts of Bangalore, called Tataguni, on Kanakpura road. He and Devika Rani lived here; after their respective deaths. In August 2011, the Government of Karnataka acquired the estate after the Supreme Court of India passed the verdict in favour of them.

Roerich family's residence in Manali, India, is now home for a gallery of paintings. It is managed by the International Roerich Trust and has been named Roerich Heritage Museum. The gallery was founded by Svetoslav Roerich in 1962. He inaugurated the Chitrakala Vidyalaya in 1964.

== Work ==
Roerich mainly painted landscapes and portraits. His paintings were first exhibited in India in 1936–1937.

His portrait of Indira Gandhi was unveiled in the Central Hall of the Parliament of India.

== Honours and awards ==
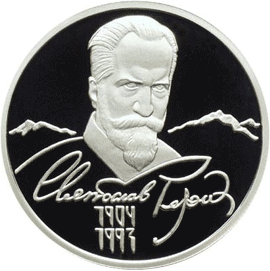
commemorative coin on his birth centenary

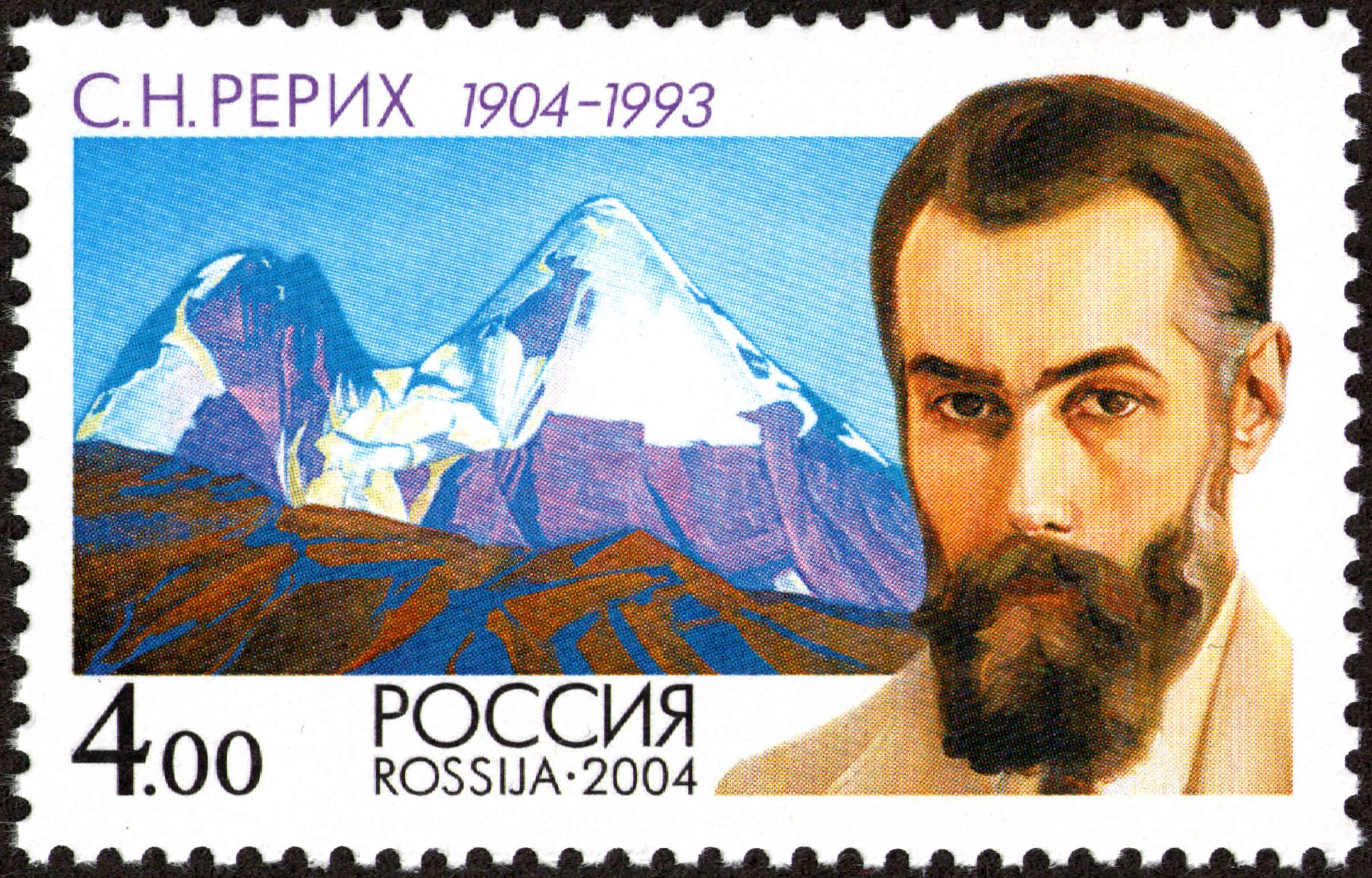
2004 Russian stamp of Roerich

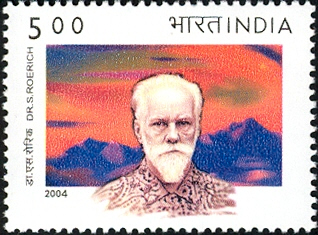
2004 Indian stamp of Roerich

- Padma Bhushan (India) (1961)
- Order of Friendship of Peoples
- Order of Madara Horseman (Bulgaria)
- Awarded Jawaharlal Nehru
- Cavalier of the Order of Cyril and Methodius (Bulgaria)
- Honorary Member of the USSR Academy of Arts
- Honorary Doctor of Veliko Tarnovo University (Bulgaria)
- Academician of the Academy of Fine Arts of India

== See also ==
- Roerichism
- Helena Roerich
- Nicholas Roerich
- George de Roerich
- Pax Cultura
- Yuli Mikhailovich Vorontsov — president of International Centre of the Roerichs (Moscow)
- Sree Chitra Art Gallery

== Notes ==
^α Also anglicised as Svyatoslav Rerikh
