= Röhrich =

Röhrich is a German-language surname. It may refer to:

- Rod Rohrich, American plastic surgeon
- Lutz Röhrich (1922-2006), German folklorist
- The namesake of the Gustav Rohrich Sod House
- Walter Roehrich, of Roehr Motorcycle Company

== See also ==
- Roerich (disambiguation)
- Röhricht
- Rorich
