= Rorich =

Rorich can be both given name and surname. Notable people with the name include:

- Gershon Rorich (23 October 1973 – 3 April 2023) was a South African beach volleyball player
- Rorgon I, Count of Maine
- Charles Minnaar (Charles William Rorich Minnaar)
