= Roerichism =

Spiritual, cultural and social movement

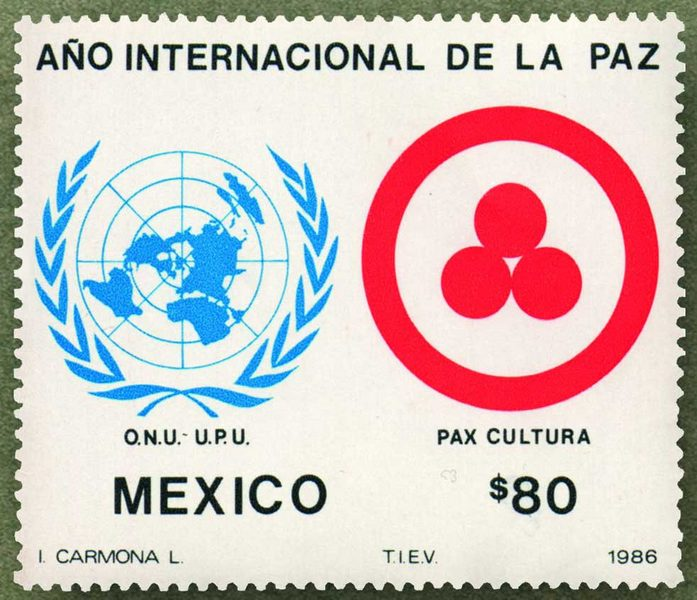
The UN and the Banner of Peace—Symbol of Roerichism: the Pax Cultura, the true culture being the "Cult of Light", the "Light of Fire", the all-pervading Fire (Agni). Stamp, 1986

Roerichism or Rerikhism (Russian: Рерихи́зм, Рерихиа́нство, Ре́риховское движе́ние) is a spiritual, cultural and social movement that emerged in the United States in the first half of the twentieth century, though it has been described as a "thoroughly Russian new religious movement", due to its close connection with Russia.

The movement centers on the Neo-Theosophical religious doctrine of Agni Yoga, or the Living Ethics, transmitted by Helena Roerich and Nicholas Roerich. Agni Yoga draws ideas from Theosophy, Eastern and Western religions, Vedic and Buddhist traditions, molding them into Russian culture, too. Agni Yoga is the spiritual foundation of Roerichism.

This movement played a significant role in bringing knowledge of Asian religions to the Western world. Roerichism has an international following and has many thousands of adherents. Some international and regional organizations, whose activity is based on the ideas of Roerichism, arose many years after the death of all the members of the Roerich family.

== Teachers and their teachings ==
Roerichism is a spiritual, cultural as well as neo-Theosophic New Age movement centered on the teachings transmitted by Helena and Nicholas Roerich. It draws ideas from Theosophy, Eastern and Western religions, and Vedic and Buddhist traditions, molding them into Russian culture and Russian cosmism.

=== Helena Roerich ===
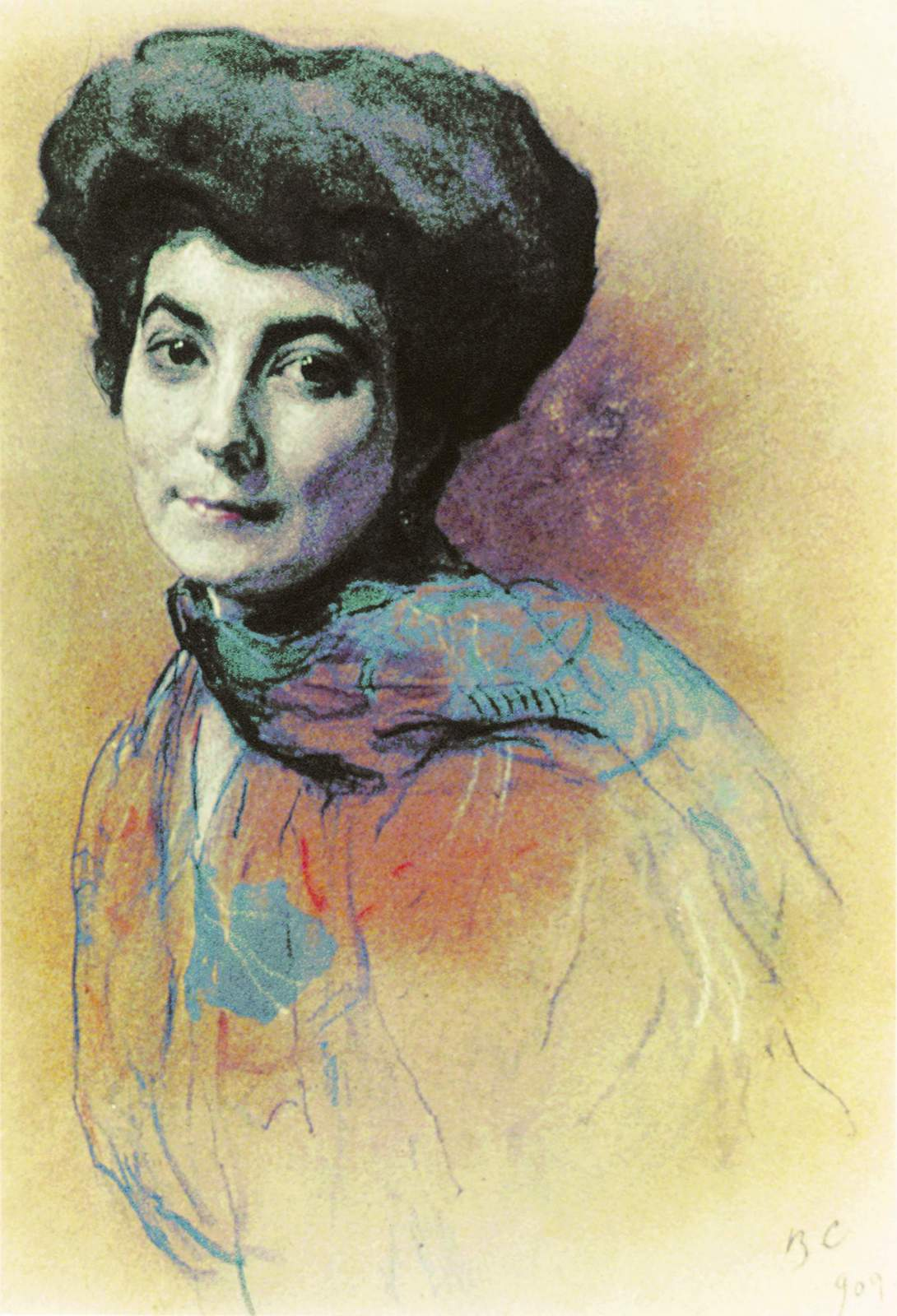
Helena Roerich, 1909 by Valentin Serov

Helena Roerich (1879–1955), a Russian theosophist, writer, and public figure, developed in the 20th century, in cooperation with the Teachers of the East (Masters of the Ancient Wisdom), the philosophical teaching of Living Ethics (Agni Yoga).

Helena was born in the family of Ivan Shaposhnikov, a well-known Saint-Petersburg architect. Helena's mother belonged to an ancient Golenischev-Kutuzov family, traceable to Novgorod at the end of the 13th century. Significant members of this family included Prince (Russian: knyaz) Mikhail Kutuzov, field marshal of the Russian Empire; Arseny Golenishchev-Kutuzov, poet of the end of the 19th century; Ilya Golenishchev-Kutuzov, a philologist and poet; and Modest Mussorgsky, a well-known composer. It was a nobiliary family, distinguished not only for its nobility but for its cultural traditions too. Helena was in frequent communication with artists and scientists of the era, such as Vladimir Bekhterev, Alexander Blok, Sergei Diaghilev, Arkhip Kuindzhi, Vladimir Solovyov, Vladimir Stasov, Igor Stravinsky, and Mikhail Vrubel.

In 1901 Helena married Nicholas Roerich. From that time they were inseparable in their life and their spiritual-creative paths. She became his companion-in-arms in all his public and cultural undertakings. The Agni Yoga Society was founded by Nicholas and Helena in 1920 in the United States. (Note: It is a non-profit educational institution incorporated under the laws of the State of New York.) Together with her husband she participated in the heroic Transhimalayan expedition in Central Asia (1924–1928). After the Roerich family settled in Kullu Valley, in the Himalayas, they established the Himalayan Institute of the Scientific Studies, and its honorary president was the foundress Helena Roerich.

The years in India were the time of the most intensive work of Helena. Here she completed a major part of the books of the Agni Yoga series. She published fourteen volumes of that series. On the frontispieces of the volumes there is no author's name, since Helena Roerich considered that the sacred wisdom contained therein can not be the author's property. She considered herself an author of three books only, published under different pen-names: "The Foundations of Buddhism" (1927), "The Cryptograms of the East" (1929), "The Banner of the Reverent Sergius" (1934). She maintained very active correspondence with many people from Europe, Asia and America. Two volumes of her letters (Letters of Helena Roerich) were published in Riga in 1940. Helena also did the translations. She translated into Russian extracts from the book The Mahatma Letters to A.P. Sinnett (The Chalice of the East) and also two volumes of The Secret Doctrine by Helena Blavatsky.

=== Nicholas Roerich ===
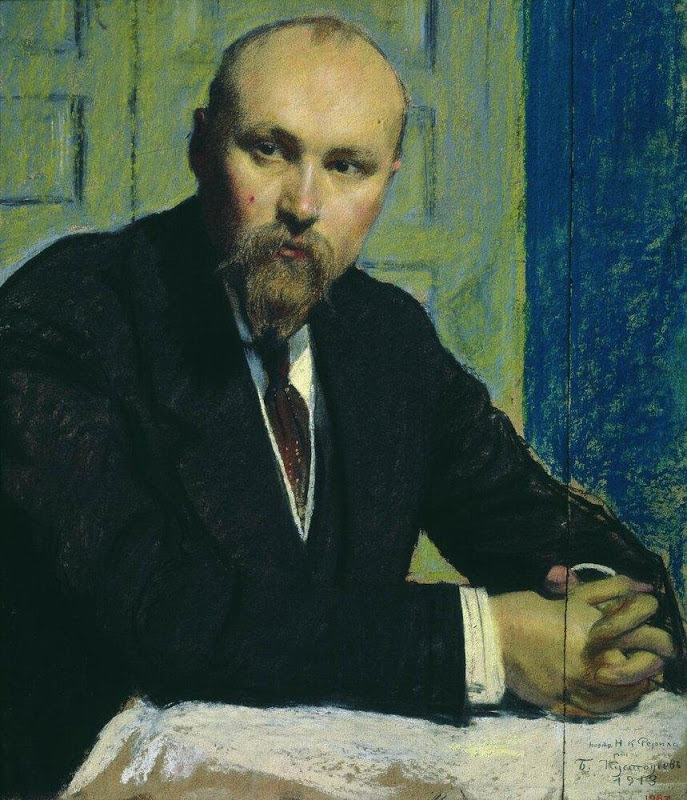
Nicholas Roerich, 1913 by Boris Kustodiev

Nicholas Roerich (1874–1947) was a Russian painter, writer, archaeologist, theosophist, philosopher, and public figure. He is perceived by some people as a spiritual teacher and guru.

He studied at the Karl May School, at the Imperial Academy of Arts, and at St. Petersburg University from 1893 to 1898, and simultaneously at the Law University as well. He wrote,"From 1890s, I saw accurate symbolisms of their people's morals shown in the main directions of philosophy, cultural memorials, monuments, literature and religions from ancient India, China, Tibet and Mongolian culture". For forty-two years Roerich lived in Russia, in India for twenty years, in the United States for three years, in Finland for two years, in France for one year, in England for one year, in China for two years, in Tibet for half a year and in Mongolia for seven–eight months. Roerich twice toured through Central and Eastern Asia, in 1924 and 1934, and following his travels in Mongolia's Gobi, in the Altai Mountains and the Himalayan Mountains, he wrote the books "Heart of Asia" and "Altai-Himalaya". In order for humankind to coexist peacefully, he initiated the Roerich Pact during World War II for the purpose of protecting world cultural values, together with well-known international figures (Albert Einstein, Tagore). Roerich's paintings, so attractive with their combinations of colours, symbols, and secrets, depict hidden ideas and deep meanings. Roerich, knowing the Buddha legend, toured through the Indian and Tibetan mountains looking for the legendary Shambhala. The Roerichs are also famous for introducing Shambhala in the Buddhist teachings of Western countries.

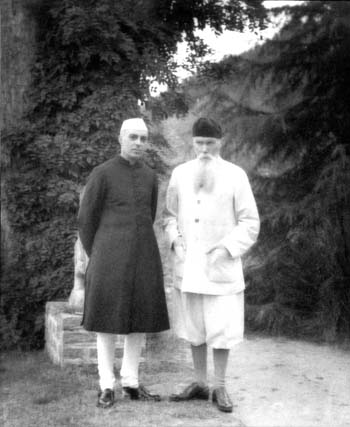
Jawaharlal Nehru and Nicholas Roerich, 1942

Jawaharlal Nehru's tribute to Roerich,

When I think of Nicholas Roerich I am astounded at the scope and abundance of his activities and creative genius. A great artist, a great scholar and writer, archaeologist and explorer, he touched and lighted up so many aspects of human endeavour. The very quantity is stupendous – thousands of paintings and each one of them a great work of art. When you look at these paintings, so many of them of the Himalayas, you seem to catch the spirit of those great mountains which have towered over the Indian plain and been our sentinels for ages past. They remind us of so much in our history, our thought, our cultural and spiritual heritage so much not merely of the India of the past but of something that is permanent and eternal about India, that we cannot help feeling a great sense of indebtedness to Nicholas Roerich who has enshrined that spirit in these magnificent canvases.

=== Roerich's sons ===
Nicholas and Helena had two children: George (1902 – 1960) and Svetoslav (1904 – 1993).

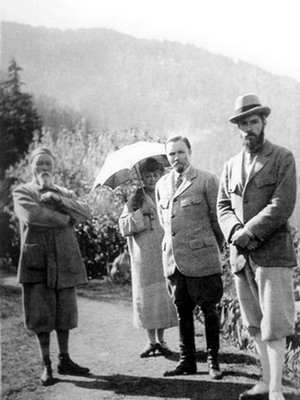
Nicholas, Helena, George, and Svetoslav at Kullu valley, Himachal Pradesh, India

==== George de Roerich ====
In August 1902 their eldest son, George, was born in Okulovka, Novgorod Oblast. After finishing his studies at Karl May School, he entered the Indian and Iranian department of Oriental Languages at London University in 1918. Under the Indologist Edward Denison Ross he studied Sanskrit and Pali. Later he became a world-renowned scientist, orientalist, and guru. George is known for his contributions to Tibetan dialectology, his monumental translation of the Blue Annals, and his 11-volume Tibetan-Russian-English dictionary with Sanskrit parallels. After spending almost thirty years in India, George returned in 1957 to Russia. His return and acquisition of Soviet citizenship was courageous as the USSR's opinion on his family was rather distorted. Because of his effort, bans were lifted on everything associated with Roerichism and the legacy of research left by the family was preserved. The first of Nicholas Roerich's exhibitions was organized in Moscow in 1958, then spread to Leningrad, Riga, Kiev, Tbilisi, and other cities. He was able to dispel myths about the family's philosophy of Agni Yoga or Living Ethics in the USSR. George died on 21 May 1960, and his ashes were placed in Moscow, at the Novodevichy Cemetery. Svetoslav Roerich is the author of the memorial to this outstanding Russian scientists.

==== Svetoslav Roerich ====
Their younger son, Svetoslav, was born on 23 October 1904, in Saint Petersburg. In 1914–1916 he studied at the Karl May School. Since 1920 he lived in the United States. Svetoslav entered the Columbia University, where he graduated with a bachelor's degree from the department of architecture. Since 1923 he was a director of the International Centre of Art "Corona Mundi" in New York which was founded by Nicholas Roerich. In 1928 Svetoslav moved from the United States to India (Darjiling), to his family. Studying the culture, art and philosophy of India he created many paintings. Together with landscapes he painted many portraits, including the portraits of Nicholas Roerich, Jawaharlal Nehru and Devika Rani – Svetoslav's wife. One of the most beautiful ones is a portrait of his mother Helena Roerich, the woman of exceptional spiritual and physical beauty. Svetoslav headed the department of folk art and pharmacopoeia at the Institute of Himalayan Studies "Urusvati". In 1989 up to the initiative of Svetoslav the Soviet Foundation of the Roerichs was established in the USSR; at the base of it there were the study and spread of the ideas of Agni Yoga. In 1991 he gave the archives of his parents and his eldest brother, which were kept in India until that time, to the Foundation. On 30 January 1993, Svetoslav died in Bangalore.

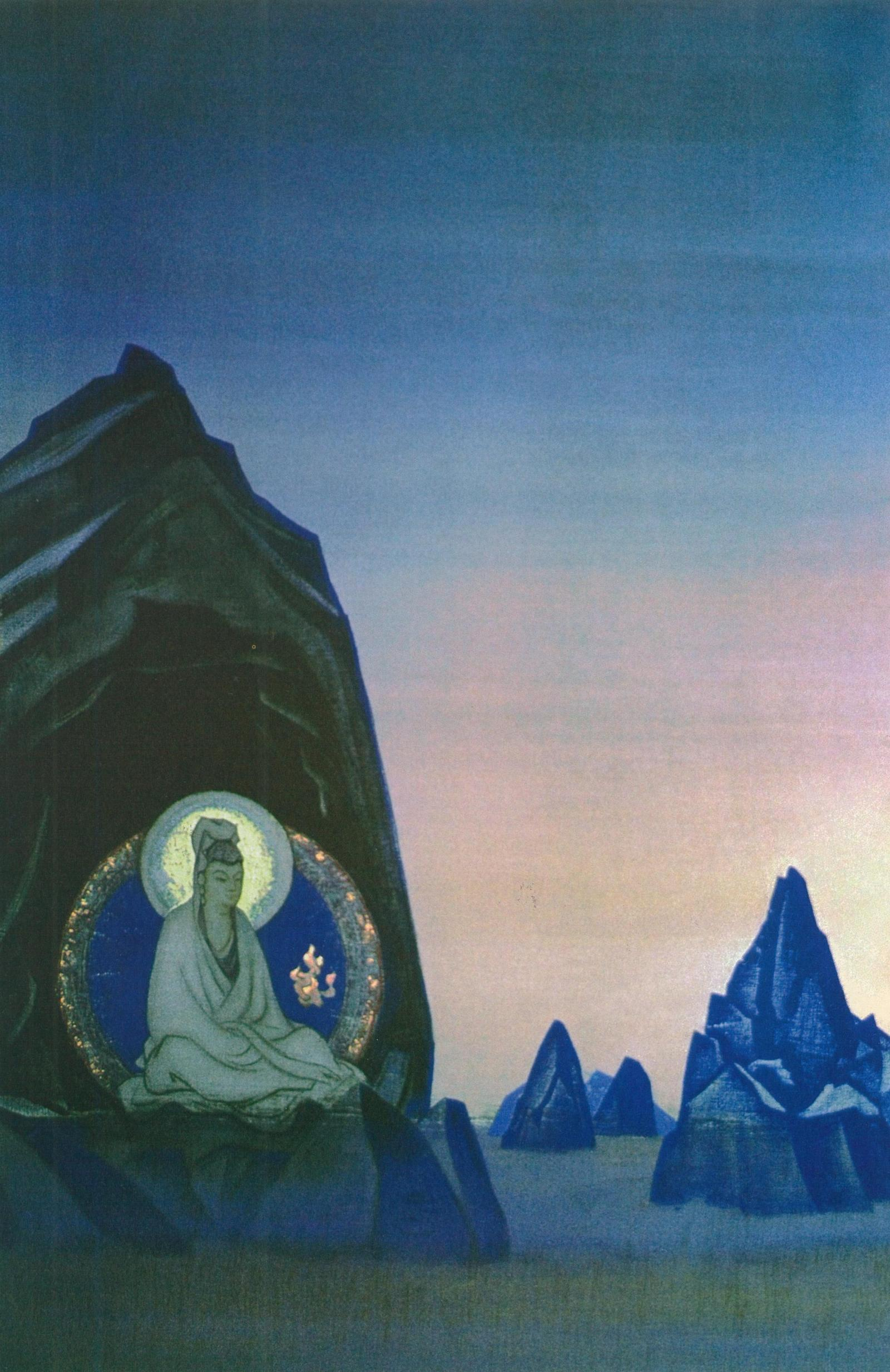
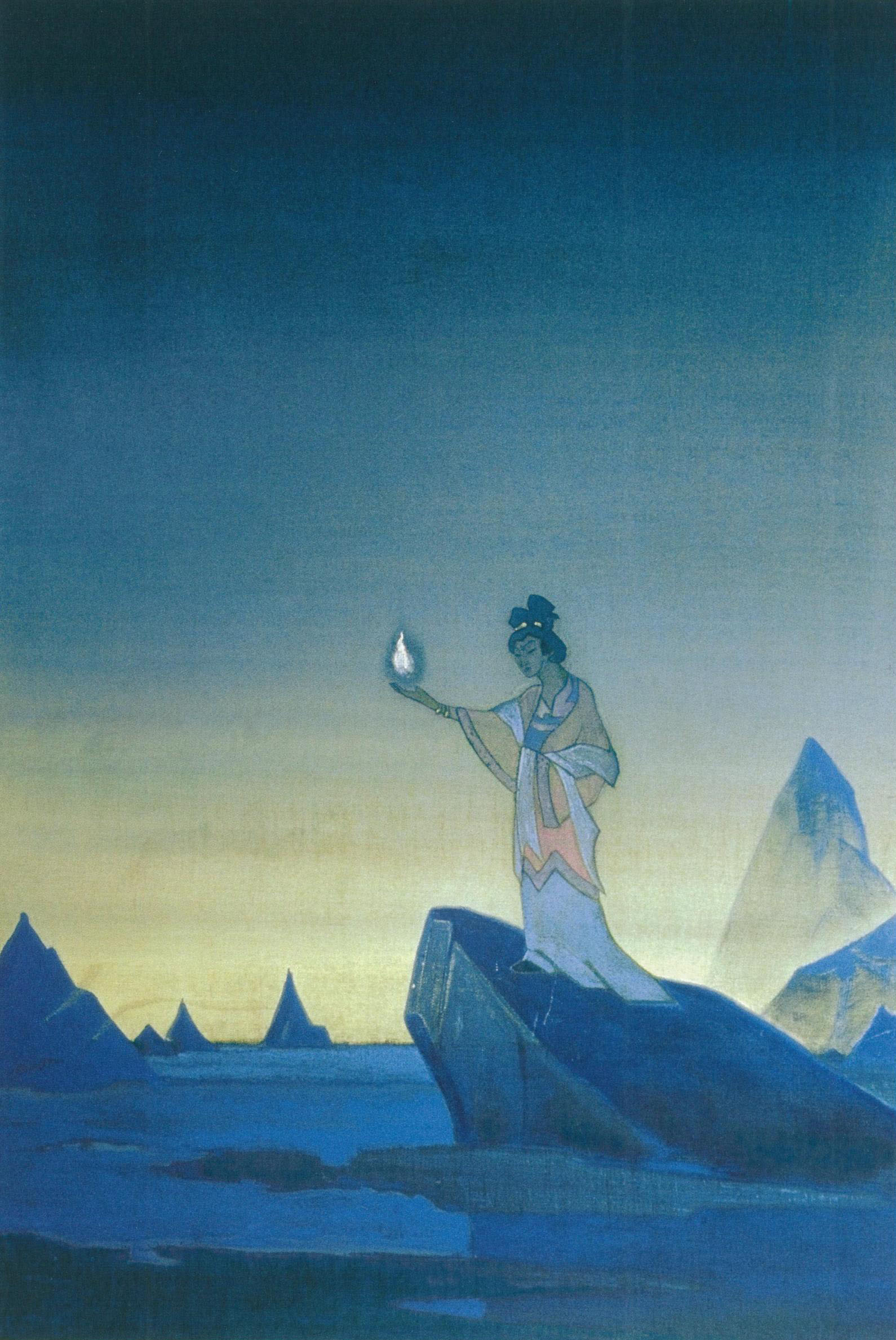
Nicholas Roerich. Agni Yoga - Diptych, 1928

=== Agni Yoga as the spiritual foundation of Roerichism ===
==== Religious doctrine ====
Agni Yoga is a religious doctrine transmitted by the Helena and Nicholas Roerichs from 1920. The followers of Agni Yoga believe that the teaching was given to the Roerich family and their associates by Master Morya, the guru of Helena Roerich and Helena Blavatsky, a founder of the Theosophical Society. In the sixteen volumes of the Teaching of Living Ethics that have been translated into English from the original Russian, as well as in the letters of Helena Roerich, the Agni Yoga teaching is also referred to as the Teaching of Living Ethics, the Teaching of Life, the Teaching of Light, or simply as the Teaching.

Being based on the ancient knowledge of the East and the achievements of modern science in the West, Agni Yoga concerns peculiarities of the cosmic evolution of humanity and creates a new system of perception. The Teaching pays particular attention to the cosmic laws that determine the motion of planets and growth of natural structures, birth of stars, and also human behavior and the development of the universe. The authors of the Teaching state that these laws influence the historic and social processes in human life and unless humanity realizes this life can't be improved. According to Agni Yoga, the universe is the immense spiritual-energy system in which a man plays the most important role. Moral perfection, strict observance of ethical laws and comprehension of the key factor of culture in the development of human society are basic principles of spiritual and historical development of humanity. It is impossible to build a better future without respecting knowledge and culture.

A man, according to the Teaching, influences the cosmic processes greatly. Particular attention is paid to the consciousness of a man and the culture of thinking, since thought is energy, capable of filling space and effecting its surroundings. A man is directly responsible for the quality of his thoughts, words, and deeds, because not only his spiritual and physical health depend on them, but also the condition of the entire planet. Calling people to live in accordance with cosmic laws, Agni Yoga opens unlimited possibilities for the spiritual transformation of life, the expansion of consciousness, and the acquirement of high moral standards.

==== The Agni Yoga Society ====
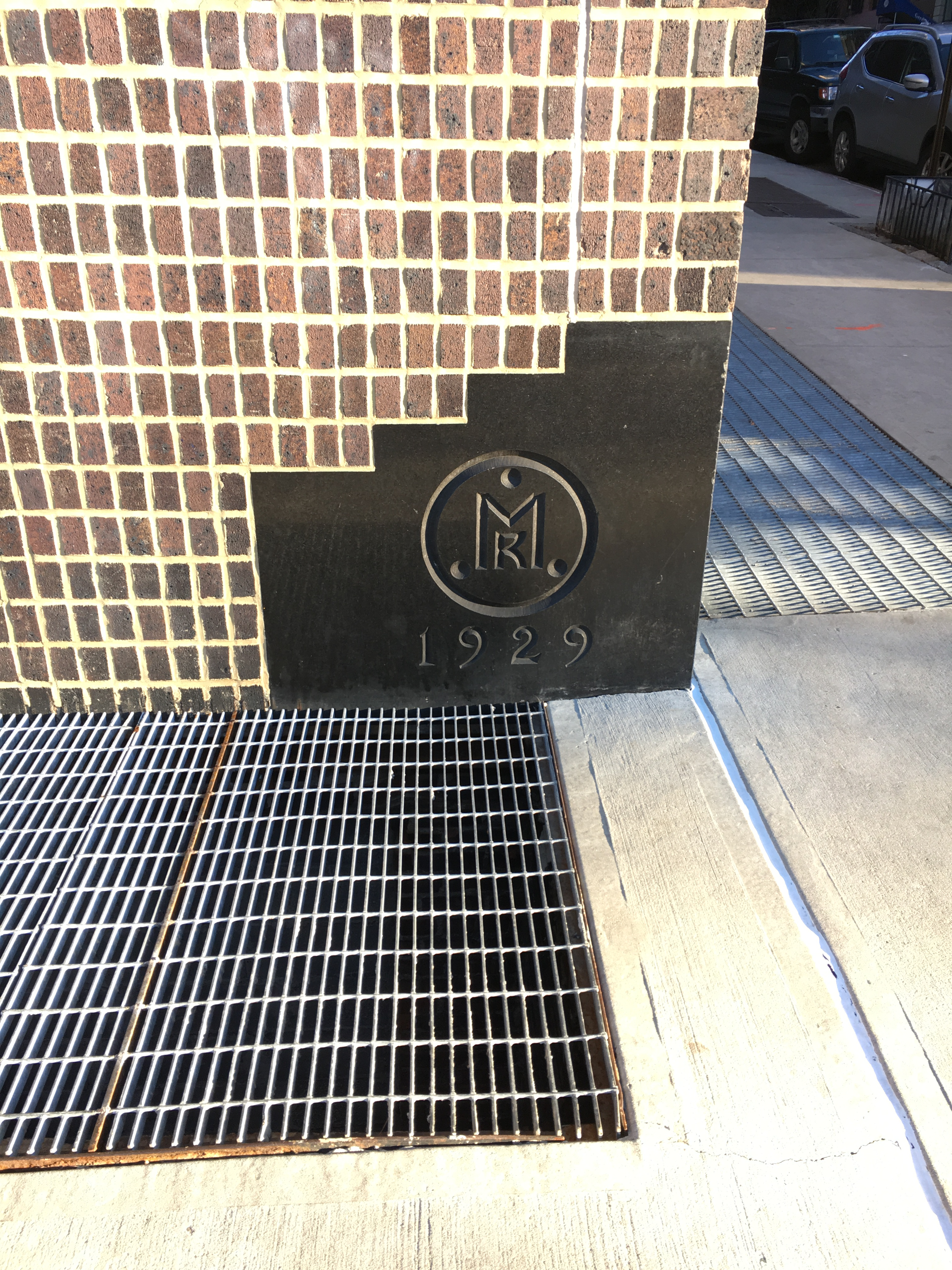
Master Building (bottom corner, logo and date engraved)

The Agni Yoga Society was founded in 1920 by Helena and Nicholas Roerich. It is a non-profit educational institution incorporated in 1946 under the laws of the State of New York, and is supported entirely by voluntary contributions and membership dues. This organization was located in the building called "Master Apartments". The aims of the Society are embodied in the philosophy that gives it its name — Agni Yoga — as contained in the books of the Agni Yoga series published by the Society. In them is found a synthesis of ancient Eastern beliefs and modern Western thought, and a bridge between the spiritual and the scientific.

Unlike previous yogas, Agni Yoga is a path not of physical disciplines, meditation, or asceticism — but of practice in daily life. It is the yoga of fiery energy, of consciousness, of responsible, directed thought. It teaches that the evolution of the planetary consciousness is a pressing necessity and that, through individual striving, it is an attainable aspiration for mankind. It affirms the existence of the hierarchy of light and the center of the heart as the link with the hierarchy and with the far-off worlds. Though not systematized in an ordinary sense, Agni Yoga is a Teaching that helps the discerning student to discover moral and spiritual guide-posts by which to learn to govern his or her life and thus contribute to the common good. For this reason Agni Yoga has been called a "living ethic". Speaking about the individual's role in human spiritual evolution, Helena Roerich wrote "The greatest benefit that we can contribute consists in the broadening of consciousness, and the improvement and enrichment of our thinking, which, together with the purification of the heart, strengthens our emanations. And thus, raising our vibrations, we restore the health of all that surrounds us".

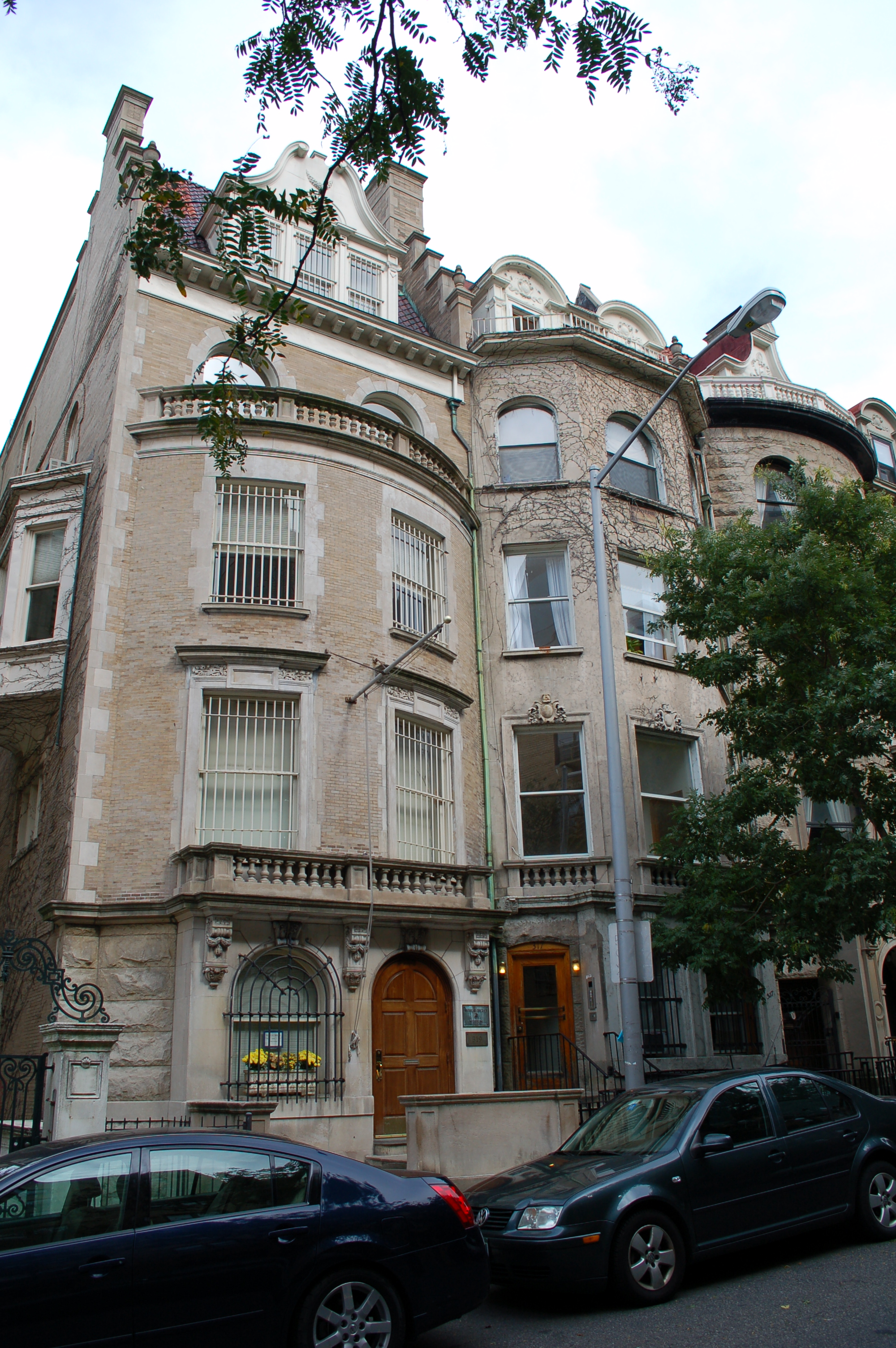
Nicholas Roerich Museum

=== The Master Institute of United Arts and Nicholas Roerich Museum ===
The Master Institute of United Arts came into being in 1920 as the Master School of United Arts. It struggled to survive until, in 1922, Louis Horch financed its transfer from a single-room, all-in-one studio at 314 West 54th Street to a mansion he bought on the site where the Master Building would later be constructed. Originally built to house a museum for Nicholas Roerich, a school, an auditorium and a restaurant in a residential hotel, the building was designed by Helmle, Corbett & Harrison and Sugarman & Berger. They were attracted to the spiritual quest in which the Roerichs were engaged and participated in sessions during which Helena Roerich would receive instructions from Master Morya and Nicholas Roerich would record them on scrolls of paper that were later transcribed into a series of texts, the "Leaves of Morya's Garden", which follows, appears to encourage the construction of a building, such as the Master Building, as an educational center for spiritual enlightenment. The Master Institute aimed to give students a well-rounded education in the arts and also to "open the gates to spiritual enlightenment" through culture.

The mansion where it was located also housed the Nicholas Roerich Museum, containing many of the thousands of paintings Roerich had created, and "Corona Mundi", which arranged exhibitions of paintings by Roerich and international artists. The Nicholas Roerich Museum in New York City is dedicated to the works of Nicholas Roerich, whose work focused on nature scenes from the Himalayas. The museum is located in a brownstone at 319 West 107th Street on Manhattan's Upper West Side. The museum was originally located in the Master Apartments at 103rd Street and Riverside Drive, which were built especially for Roerich in 1929. Currently, the museum includes between 100 and 200 of Roerich's works as well as a collection of archival materials. The Nicholas Roerich Museum in New York is the largest center of Roerich-related activity outside of Russia.

=== Latvian Roerich Society ===
The Latvian Roerich Society in Riga became one of the global centers of the Roerich movement; it began its activities in the mid-1920s and was officially registered on October 13, 1930. The society was particularly active in publishing books in Russian and Latvian, and it was here that certain works by the Roerichs were published for the first time. The Latvian poet and scholar of the East Richard Rudzitis served as one of the society's leaders. The Society ceased operations following Latvia's incorporation into the USSR and resumed activity and reregistration only in 1988.

=== Roerich Pact and Banner of Peace ===
The Roerich Pact and Banner of Peace movement grew rapidly during the early nineteen-thirties, with centers in a number of countries. There were three international conferences, in Bruges, Belgium, in Montevideo, Uruguay, and in Washington, D.C. The Pact itself declared the necessity for the protection of the cultural product and activity of the world — both during war and peace — and prescribed the method by which all sites of cultural value would be declared neutral and protected, just as the Red Cross does with hospitals. Indeed, the Roerich Pact was often called The Red Cross of Culture:

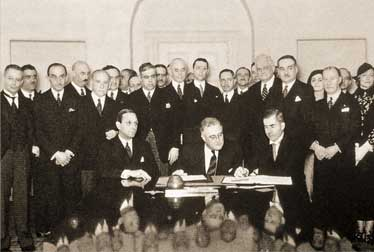
Signing of the Roerich Pact in White House 15 April 1935 (in centre: FDR)

NOW, THEREFORE be it known that I, Franklin D. Roosevelt, President of the United States of America, have caused the said Treaty to be made public to the end that the same and every article and clause thereof may be observed and fulfilled with good faith by the United States of America and the citizens thereof. IN TESTIMONY WHEREOF, I have caused the Seal of the United States of America to be hereunto affixed. DONE at the city of Washington this twenty-fifth day of October in the year of our Lord one thousand nine hundred and thirty-five, and of the Independence of the United States of America the one hundred and sixtieth.

FRANKLIN D. ROOSEVELT

By the President: Cordell Hull Secretary of State.

Some ideas of the Roerich Pact still are not implemented in the international law, especially its principle of preference for the preservation of cultural values over military necessity.

=== The American-Russian Cultural Association ===
The American-Russian Cultural Association (Russian: Америка́но–ру́сская культу́рная ассоциа́ция) was organized in the US in 1942 to encourage cultural ties between the Soviet Union and the United States, with Nicholas Roerich as honorary president. The group's first annual report was issued the following year. The group does not appear to have lasted much past Nicholas Roerich's death in 1947.

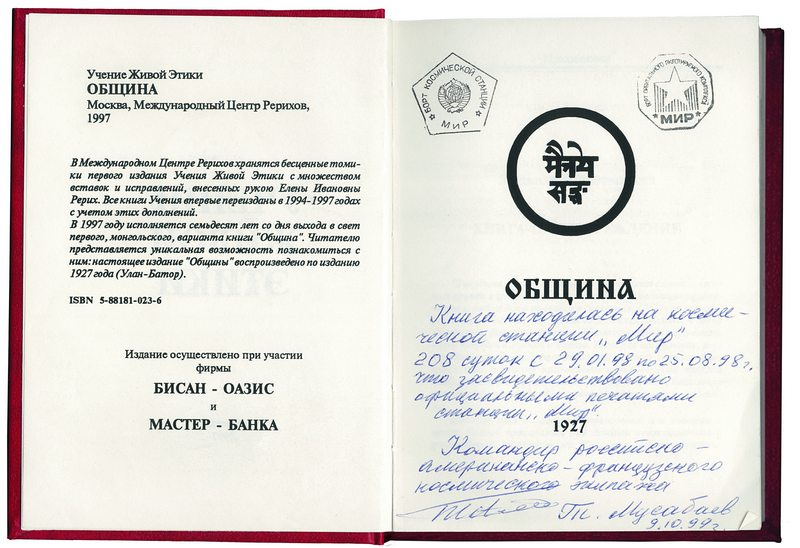
A book New Era Community (Russian: Община) from the Teaching which was on board of Orbital station "Mir" in 1999

=== International Center of the Roerichs and Museum named after Nicholas Roerich ===
The International Center of the Roerichs (Russian: Междунаро́дный це́нтр Ре́рихов) is a non-governmental public association of citizens and public associations incorporated on the basis of their common interests in the cause of study, preservation, and popularization of the Roerich family heritage. The center is an associated member of the Non-Governmental Organizations Association under the United Nations Department of Public Information.

The Museum named after Nicholas Roerich (Russian: Музе́й и́мени Н. К. Ре́риха Междунаро́дного це́нтра Ре́рихов) contains the Roerichs' cultural heritage passed on to the Soviet Roerichs' Foundation (now International Center of the Roerichs) by Svetoslav Roerich in 1990. It carries with itself a new cosmic world view. The core of Roerichism is the philosophy of cosmic reality – Agni Yoga, which develops the idea of a close relationship between mankind and the cosmos and transmits knowledge which assists in understanding the features peculiar to the new evolutionary stage of mankind's development.

== Post-Roerichs ==
The Teaching of Life, which contains a new, cosmic worldview, has played and continues to play an enormous role in paving the way for spiritual evolution. The Roerich movement, like any social movement in the process of formation, has its difficulties and problems. Some international and regional organizations, whose activity is based on the ideas of Roerichism, arose many years after the death of all members of the Roerich family.

=== The World Organisation of Culture of Health (WOCH) ===
The World Organisation of Culture of Health was founded in the year 1994. Victor Skumin was elected to the post of president-founder of the World Organisation of Culture of Health — International social movement "To Health via Culture" (Russian: Междунаро́дное обще́ственное Движе́ние «К Здоро́вью че́рез Культу́ру»). The organization operates in accordance with what written in the charter registered with the Ministry of Justice of the Russian Federation. A key element of a "Culture of Health" is to implement innovative health programs that support a holistic approach to physical, mental and spiritual well-being both inside and outside the workplace. The culture of heath is an integral sphere of knowledge that develops and solves theoretical and practical tasks of harmonious development of people's spiritual, mental, and physical strength, health improvement of biosocial environment that provides a higher life creative level on this basis (by Skumin and Bobina, 1994).

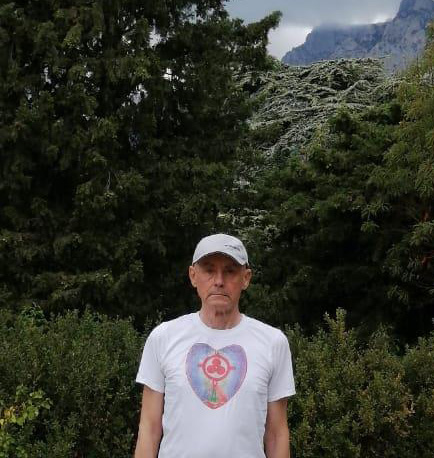
Victor Skumin in 2020

This organization, in order to promote international relations, has established a link with the International Buddhist Meditation Centre at Kathmandu. The Russian Orthodox Church is critical of the WOCH and qualifies its ideology of Agni Yoga as New Age:

The ideology of the New Age serves outstanding contemporary philosophers: Gregory Bateson, Ken Wilber, Paul Feyerabend. On a grand scale is the creation and support of international organizations, contained in the ideology of the New Age. In Russia and in Ukraine, the international movement "To Health via Culture", based on the teachings of Agni Yoga, operates and has a great publishing activity.

The relationship between Skumin's doctrine of culture of health and Roerichism is also confirmed by some scientists, such as V. P. Goraschuk, professor at H.S. Skovoroda Kharkiv National Pedagogical University. In 2004, he wrote in his thesis for a doctor's degree on the speciality "general pedagogics and history of pedagogics",

V. Skumin developed the problems associated with a culture of health in the context of philosophy of Roerich.

The anthem of WOCH ("To Health via Culture") consists of four stanzas. The capital letters each of the four stanzas form the word Agni. (Anthem "To Health via Culture." on YouTube). Another hymn by Skumin is termed "Urusvati". Helena Roerich, known as the Tara Urusvati in Agni Yoga and Roerichism. The hymn begins with the phrase "The fire of the heart ignites Urusvati, she teaches the spirit take-off on the wings of the grace".

Skumin elaborated on the conceptions of spiritual evolution and proposed (1990) the classification of Homo spiritalis (Latin: "spiritual man"), the sixth root race, consisting of eight sub-races (subspecies) – HS0 Anabiosis spiritalis, HS1 Scientella spiritalis, HS2 Aurora spiritalis, HS3 Ascensus spiritalis, HS4 Vocatus spiritalis, HS5 Illuminatio spiritalis, НS6 Creatio spiritalis, and HS7 Servitus spiritalis.

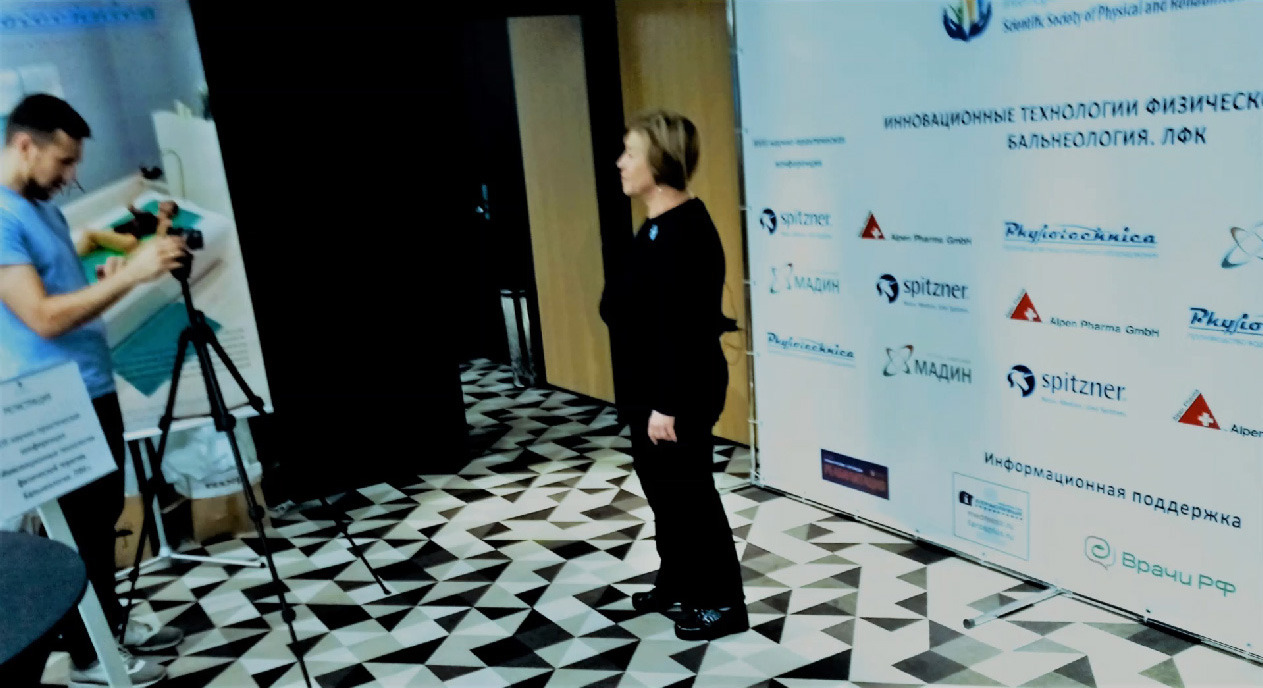
Chairman of the Board of the WOCH Lyudmila Bobina. Moscow, 2019

The Journal of the World Organisation of Culture of Health ("World Health Culture Organization") is based in Novocheboksarsk. In 1995, Victor Skumin became the first editor-in-chief of the journal To Health via Culture. The journal received an International Standard Serial Number (ISSN) 0204–3440. The main topics of the magazine are the dissemination of ideas of culture of health, holistic medicine, Roerichism, and Agni Yoga.

The Organization also has its own publishing house ("To Health via Culture"), which has the right to publish the books with the International Standard Book Number (ISBN).

== Sources ==
- Agadjanian, Alexander (2014). "The New Age of Russia: Occult and Esoteric Dimensions". Nova Religio: The Journal of Alternative and Emergent Religions. 17 (3). University of California Press: 136–138. doi:10.1525/nr.2014.17.3.136. JSTOR 10.1525/nr.2014.17.3.136.
- Davis, Nathaniel (2000). "Tribulations, Trials and Troubles for the Russian Orthodox Church". Occasional Papers on Religion in Eastern Europe. 20 (6). George Fox University. ISSN 1069-4781. Archived from the original on 13 February 2021. "Brief mention of Roerichism: p. 46"
- Gindilis, L.M.; Frolov, V.V. (Summer 2002). "Philosophy of Living Ethics and its interpreters. Roerich's movement in Russia" (PDF). Russian Studies in Philosophy. 41 (1): 65–90. doi:10.2753/RSP1061-1967410165. S2CID 54890519. Archived (PDF) from the original on 24 September 2015.
- Lunkin, Roman; Filatov, Sergei (2000). "The Rerikh Movement: A Homegrown Russian New Religious Movement". Religion, State and Society. 28 (1): 135–148. doi:10.1080/713694743. S2CID 55200851. Archived (PDF) from the original on 27 June 2021. | Also on "A Homegrown Russian New Religious Movement". vatican.va. Archived from the original on 23 March 2021.
- McCannon, J. (2002). "By the shores of white waters: the Altai and its place in the spiritual geopolitics of Nicholas Roerich" (PDF). Sibirica: Journal of Siberian Studies. Archived from the original (PDF) on 4 March 2016.
- Stasulane, Anita (2005). Theosophy and culture: Nicholas Roerich. Interreligious Series, 8. Roma: Pontificia Università gregoriana. ISBN 978-88-7839-035-5.
