= Helena Roerich =

Russian philosopher (1879–1955)

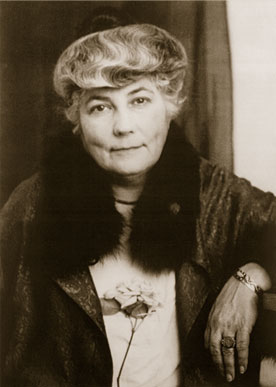
- Born: 12 February 1879; Saint Petersburg, Russia
- Died: 5 October 1955 (aged 76); Kalimpong, India

Philosophical work
- Era: 20th-century philosophy
- Region: Russian philosophy
- School: Living Ethics

Helena Ivanovna Roerich (Russian: Елена Ивановна Рерих; née Shaposhnikova (Шапошникова); 12 February [O.S. 31 January] 1879 – 5 October 1955) was a Russian theosophist, writer, philosopher, and public figure. She and her husband Nicholas Roerich were the principal articulators of the Agni Yoga neo-theosophical teachings, which they claimed had been transmitted to them from the spiritual adept known as Morya. Along with her husband, she took part in expeditions of hard-to-reach and little-investigated regions of Central Asia, and lobbied for ratification of the Roerich Pact, an early international treaty regarding the protection of the cultural heritage. She was an Honorary President-Founder of the Urusvati Himalayan Research Institute in India. She translated two volumes of the Secret Doctrine of H. P. Blavatsky, and selected Mahatma's Letters (Cup of the East), from English to Russian.

== Early life ==
Roerich was the daughter of Ivan Ivanovich Shaposhnikov, a well-known Saint-Petersburg architect. She had two siblings, Anna and Hilarion.

Her mother Ekaterina Vassilievna Shaposhnikova belonged to an ancient Golenischev-Kutuzov family, which originated from Novgorod at the end of the 13th century. Significant members of this family included field marshal Mikhail Illarionovich Golenischev-Kutuzov, a well-known poet of the end of 19th century; Arsenii Arkadievich Golenischev-Kutuzov, composer; and Modest Petrovich Mussorgsky.

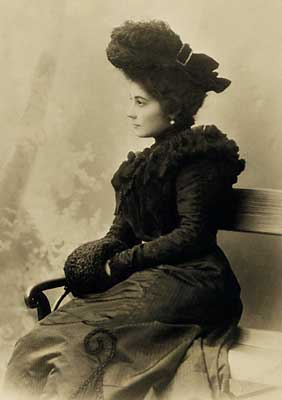
Helena Ivanovna Roerich. 1900. Saint Petersburg

Roerich grew up and was educated in the rich cultural traditions of her family. From childhood she was inquisitive, and independent. She showed talents in a number of areas, playing piano, and by the age of seven reading and writing in three languages./ From a very young age, she started reading artistic, historical, spiritual and philosophic books.

In 1895, Roerich graduated from Mariinsky Gymnasium in Saint Petersburg with a "gold medal", a special award for excellence in study. Though the education she received there was of a great quality, Roerich often studied additionally on her own. She learned painting, knew Russian and European literature well, studied the history of religion and philosophy, and took great interest in the works of the Indian philosophers Ramakrishna, Vivekananda, and Rabindranath Tagore, whose great-niece, Devika Rani Choudhuri, would later marry her son, Svetoslav.

After finishing her education at gymnasium, she entered the Saint Petersburg private school of music, headed by the pianist I.A. Borovka. He was a noted figure in Petersburg's musical culture of the time, and personally mentored Roerich.

After graduating, which was aimed mainly towards revealing the most gifted candidates who should receive higher music education, Roerich intended to continue her education in the Saint Petersburg conservatoire, but her relatives banned this, worried that she would be interested by the revolutionary ideas found in the student environment. Thus, Roerich continued her education at home, where she perfected her grasp of foreign languages, and read many things.

== Marriage and family ==
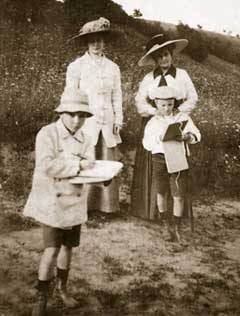
Helena Roerich (right) with her sons

Roerich and her mother often spent the summer at Bologoye in the Novgorod region, with her aunt E.V. Putyatina, at the estate of her husband, Prince P.A. Putyatin. In 1899, at Bologoye, she met the painter and archeologist Nicholas Konstantinovich Roerich. They fell in love, and in spite of her relatives' opposition, in 1901, she and Nicholas were married in Saint Petersburg.

In 2001, at the place in Bologoye where they first met, a memorial named "Monument of love" was established. It contains a quotation from N. Roerich's essay "The University": "I met Lada, my partner in life and inspirer, at Bologoye, at Prince P.A. Putyatin's estate. Joy!". This was a strong alliance of two loving people united by deep mutual feelings and common views. N. Roerich wrote about their marriage in his declining years: "We passed amicably any obstacles. And the obstacles turned into possibilities. I devoted my books: 'To Helena, my wife, friend, partner and inspirer'". Many of Roerich's paintings were a result of their common creativity. He called her "She who leads" in his books, and asserted that on many his canvases, two signatures should be written: his own, and hers. "We created together, and not without reason it was said that the works must have two names, women's and men's.

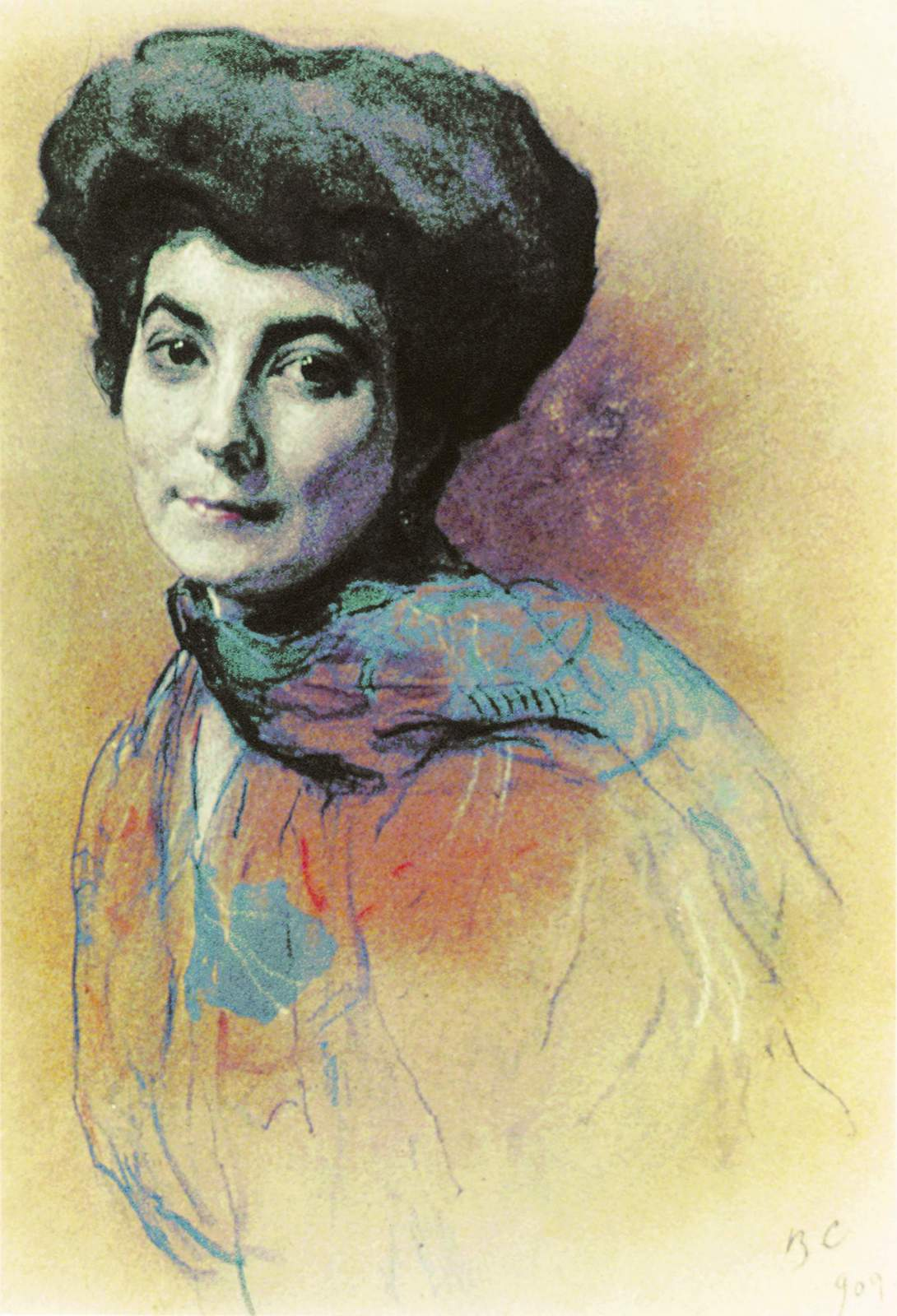
"Helena Roerich". 1909. Valentin Serov

The couple had two children. In August 1902, their eldest son George was born. Later, he became a world-renowned scientist and orientalist. Their younger son, Svetoslav, was born in October 1904. He became a painter.

Roerich supported all of her husband's initiatives, and went deeply into all his fields of study. In 1903 and 1904, they traveled together through forty old Russian cities to find sources of national history and culture. During these travels, Roerich took expert photographs of churches, architecture monuments, paintings, and ornaments. She also mastered the art of restoration and, together with Nicholas Konstantinovich, recovered some the masterpieces of great artists such as Rubens, Breughel, Van Dijck, and Belgian artist Bernard van Orley, that had been hidden by later paint layers. She also displayed her artistic intuition by collecting works of art and antiquities. Roerich built a beautiful family collection, composed of more than 300 works, which they later had transferred to the Hermitage Museum. Roerich also knew archeology. Together with her husband, she often left for excavations in the regions of Novgorod and Tver, taking part in the work.

Her husband and sons thought highly of her, revering her as the spiritual leader and keeper of the family's foundations. In 1916, because of a serious lung disease, following the doctor's insistence, she and the Roerich family moved to Finland (Serdobol), to the seashore of Lake Ladoga. In 1918, Finland declared its independence and closed the Russian border. In 1919, the family moved to England where they made their home in London.

Here, in 1920, Roerich, in collaboration with a group of anonymous Eastern thinkers and philosophers, which in accordance with Indian's spiritual tradition were named "The Great Teachers" (Mahatmas), began to work for the Living Ethics group, teaching Agni Yoga.

== Travels ==
In 1920, N. Roerich was invite to tour the United States with an exhibition of his paintings. Thus, the family moved to New York City. Here, the cultural activity was organized under N. Roerich's leadership in partnership with his wife. The culmination of this was the foundation in America of the Nicholas Roerich Museum, the Master Institute of United Arts, the International Painters Association "Cor Ardens" (Flaming Hearts), and the International Art Centre "Corona Mundi" ("Crown of the World").

In December 1923, the family moved to India. This country had always been of great interest to the Roerichs. Adoration of India and its spiritual culture was not unusual among some Russian intellectuals of the time, feeling that their moral searches coincided with Indian spiritual tradition.

From 1924 to 1928, H. Roerich took part in a Central Asian expedition organized by N. K. Roerich, that traveled through hard-to-reach and little-investigated regions of India, China, Russia-Altai, Mongolia and Tibet. During the expedition, they researched topics such as history, archeology, ethnography, history of philosophy, arts and religions, and geography. Previously unknown mountain peaks and passes were mapped, rare manuscripts were found, and rich linguistic materials were collected. Special attention was paid to revealing the historical unity of cultures of various peoples. The expedition was carried out in very difficult conditions. Roerich shared all hardships of the travel with the others: hard passages, robber attacks, and obstacles created by English officials that nearly resulted in death of the expedition. In April 1925. when N. Roerich's expedition stayed in Gulmarg, Helena Roerich began to translate an extensive selection from Blavatsky's Mahatma's Letters from English to Russian, which she published in London in 1923. She also wrote a book named Chalice of the East, which was published that year under the pen name "Iskander Khanum".

Roerich's manuscript "Foundations of Buddhism" was published in 1926, at Urga (now Ulan-Bator), where her expedition was staying at the time. In this book, the fundamental philosophical notions of Buddha's teaching were interpreted. The book also spoke about the moral basis of this teaching and helped spark interest in Buddhism in the West.

In 1927, one of the Living Ethics books (Community) was published in the same place in Mongolia. After finishing of Central Asian expedition, the Roerichs remained in India, in Kullu valley Himachal Pradesh. There, in 1928, they founded an Institute of Himalayan Studies "Urusvati" (this means "Light of Morning Star" in Sanskrit). It was planned as an institute for complex study of Asian regions which exerted influence on the development of world culture. Among the tasks of Urusvati was the complex study of the psychic and physiological features of a human. Roerich became an Honorary President-Founder of the institute and actively took part in organizing its work. Being a subtle art connoisseur and deep philosopher, she knew well the scientific problems of the institute, and often directed the researches as an experienced scientist. The main task of Roerich's activity was in studying the ancient philosophic thought of the East.

Helena Roerich had dreamed that a city of knowledge would rise in Kullu valley, which would become an international scientific centre. Later Urusvati became a large international institute that united well-known scientists from many countries. J. Bose, R. Tagore, A. Einstein, R. Millikan, L. de Broglie, R. Magoffin, S. Gedin, S.I. Metalnikov, N.I. Vavilov et al. had collaborated with it.

In Kullu, Roerich continued her work on Living Ethics, the main work of her life. In 1929, her work "Cryptograms of the East" ("On Eastern Crossroads") was published in Paris in Russian under the pen name Josephine Saint Hilaire. This work contains apocryphal legends and parables from the lives of great devotees and teachers of mankind: Buddha, Christ, Apollonius of Tyana, Akbar the Great, Russian saintSergius of Radonezh. Roerich devoted a special essay "The Banner of St. Sergius of Radonezh" to an image of the Savior and Defender of Russian land. In this essay she joined knowledge of history and theology with deep and reverent love of the hermit. The essay was included in the book "Banner of St. Sergius of Radonezh", published under the pen name N. Yarovskaya in 1934.

== Later life ==
In the first half of the 1930s, Roerich translated two volumes of H.P. Blavatsky's fundamental work The Secret Doctrine from English to Russian.

A special place in Roerich's creativity belongs to her epistolary heritage. She corresponded with more than 140 persons over several continents. Among Roerich's correspondents were friends, followers, cultural workers and political figures. In her letters, Roerich answered numerous questions, explained the most complex philosophical and scientific problems, and the foundations of the Living Ethics. She wrote about the great Laws of the Cosmos, the meaning of human life, the importance of culture for human evolution, and the Great Teachers.

In 1940, a two-volume edition of Letters of Helena Roerich was published in Riga. A complete set of Roerich's letters is published by the International Centre of the Roerichs (ICR), where her epistolary heritage is kept. It was transferred to ICR by S.N. Roerich in 1990.

During N.K. Roerich's Manchurian expedition, she had corresponded with international organizations and coordinated activity to support the Roerich Pact, an international agreement for protection of artistic and scientific institutions and historical monuments. As a result of this work, the Roerich Pact was signed on 15 April 1935 by heads of 22 countries.

In January 1948, after her husband's death, Roerich, together with her elder son, moved to Delhi and then to Khandala, Bombay, where they waited for a steam ship from Russia with their entrance visas. But Russia denied their visas. They made their home in Kalimpong in West Bengal, though she continued to hope to return to Russia. Unfortunately, her numerous applications were ignored.

== Death ==
Roerich died on 5 October 1955. In the place of her cremation the lamas raised a white stupa on which the following epitaph was carved: "Helena Roerich, the wife of Nicholas Roerich, thinker and writer, old friend of India".

== Legacy ==
=== Minor planet ===
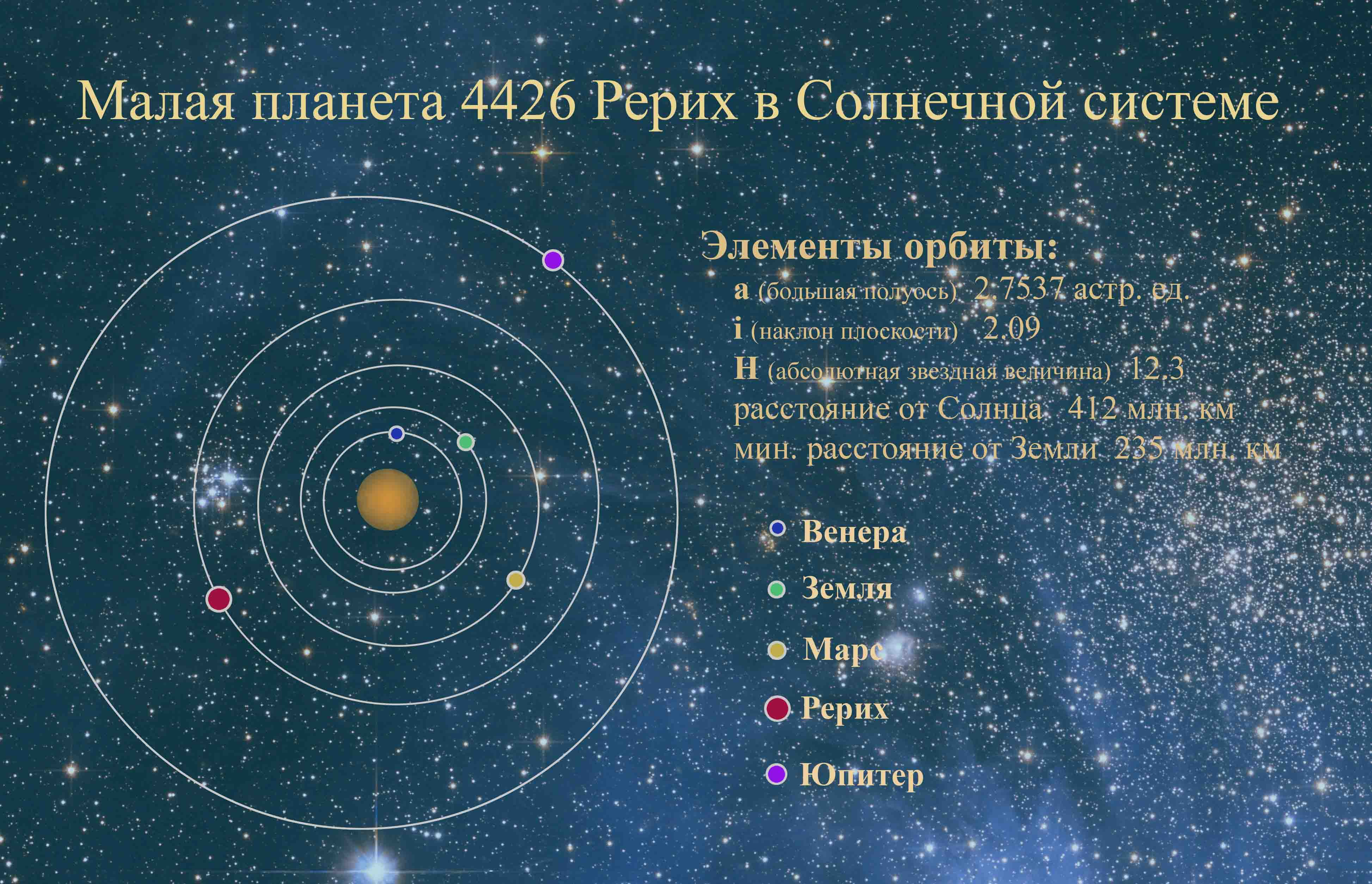
Minor planet 4426 Roerich in Solar System

On 15 October 1969 a minor planet of Solar System was discovered by astronomers of Crimean Astrophysical Observatory Nikolai Stepanovich and Lyudmila Ivanovna Chernykh. This planet was named in honor of Roerichs family. It was numbered 4426.

=== Other ===
On 6 July 1978 group of alpinists renamed a pass between the peaks "Roerich" and Belukha "Urusvati" in honor of Helena Roerich.

On 9 October 1999, during jubilee celebrations devoted to 125th anniversary of N. K. Roerich's birthday and the 120th anniversary of her birthday, a monument was established near the entrance of the International Centre of the Roerichs. This monument is a sculpture of Nicholas Konstantonovich and Helena Roerich.

In 1999, the International Centre of the Roerichs instituted a jubilee medal "Helena Roerich" dedicated to the 120th anniversary of H. I. Roerich.

In April 2003, the college of arts named after Roerich began to work in the building of the "Urusvati" Institute (India).

In 2005, the Helena Roerich Museum was opened in a retired two-storeyed mansion known as "Crookety House" in Kalimpong. Here Roerich worked during the last years of her life. Opening of the museum was timed to the 50th anniversary of her death.

A public library named after Roerich was founded in the Altaic village of Ust-Koksa. In 2007, the library held nearly 75 thousand publications. More than 1600 persons have used its service. From 2003, the library has been a member of the Russian Library Association and collective member of international library association IFLA.

A charitable foundation named after her was created in 2001 in Moscow to finance programs dedicated to popularising Roerich's heritage and the development of cultural activities. The foundation furthers activity in the field of education, science, culture, art, and enlightenment. One of the directions of the foundation's activity is the revelation of young talents in various fields of art and helping them to protect and develop their creative abilities. An international award named after Roerich was instituted by the foundation bearing her name, to encourage scientific research connected to her scientific and philosophic heritage.

== N. Roerich's paintings dedicated to Roerich ==
- Holder of the world (She who carries a stone) (see image)
- She who leads (see image)
- From beyond (see image)
- Agni Yoga (see image)

== Works ==
- Leaves of Morya's Garden II
- New Era Community
- Agni Yoga
- Infinity I
- Infinity II
- Hierarchy
- Heart
- Fiery World I
- Fiery World II
- Fiery World III
- Aum
- Brotherhood
- Supermundane I
- Supermundane II
- Supermundane III
- Supermundane IV
- Letters of Helena Roerich, Vol. I-IX
- On Eastern Crossroads
- Foundations of Buddhism
- Three key
- Theory and Practice of Agny-yoga
- Light from the East
- The banner of St. Sergius of Radonezh

== See also ==
- Roerichism
- Yuli Mikhailovich Vorontsov — President of International Centre of the Roerichs (Moscow)
- Alice A.Bailey
- Annie Besant
- Benjamin Creme
