= Roerich Pact =

International treaty for the protection of important cultural heritage

The Treaty on Protection of Artistic and Scientific Institutions and Historic Monuments
- Signed: 15 April 1935
- Location: Washington, D.C.
- Effective: 26 August 1935
- Condition: two ratifying states
- Signatories: 21
- Parties: 10
- Depositary: Pan American Union

The Treaty on the Protection of Artistic and Scientific Institutions and Historic Monuments or Roerich Pact is an inter-American treaty. The most important idea of the Roerich Pact is the legal recognition that the defense of cultural objects is more important than the use or destruction of that culture for military purposes, and the protection of culture always has precedence over any military necessity.

== Nicholas Roerich ==
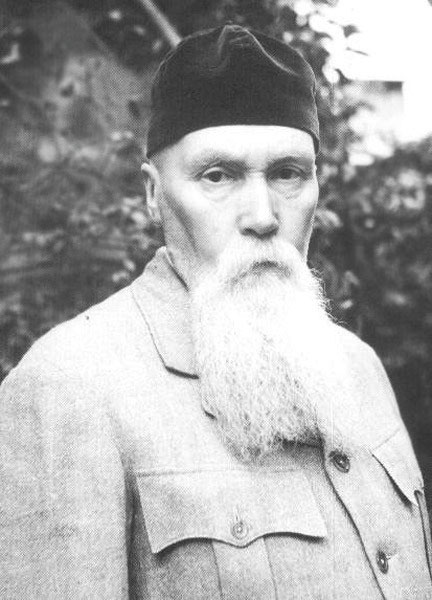
Nicholas Roerich

Russian painter and philosopher Nicholas Roerich (1874–1947) initiated the modern movement for the defense of cultural objects, for the idea of "Peace of Civilizations". Besides the recognition as one of the greatest Russian painters, Roerich's most notable achievement during his lifetime was the Roerich Pact signed on 15 April 1935 by the representatives of American states in the Oval Office of the White House (Washington, DC). It was the first international treaty signed in the Oval Office.

Nicholas Roerich was born on 9 October 9, 1874, in St. Petersburg. His parents encouraged him to study law, but seeing their son's inclination for painting, they allowed him to study both, which he did with much success. In 1900, Roerich went to Paris to take lessons from Fernand Cormon, the well known tutor of Van Gogh and Toulouse-Lautrec. Upon his return to St. Petersburg, he married Helena Shaposhnikova, who later developed the Agni Yoga philosophy. Soon Roerich became quite a successful painter. One of his paintings was purchased by Russian Tsar Nicolas II himself. Roerich also worked as stage and costume designer for several operas and ballets by Maurice Maeterlinck and Igor Stravinsky, premiered in St. Petersburg.

In 1917, Roerich went to live near a lake in Finland, to strengthen his health. After the border between Russia and Finland was closed in 1918 in the context of the October Revolution and Finnish Civil War, the family travelled across several Scandinavian countries to Great Britain and eventually left for North America in 1920. There, Roerich founded two cultural institutions: "Cor Ardens" (Flaming Heart, a fraternity of artists from several countries) and "The Master Institute of United Arts" (an organization for education, science, and philosophy).

In 1923, the Roerich Museum was founded in New York. In 1929, it moved to a new building. Presently, the Roerich Museum is located in Manhattan, at the corner of 107th Street and Riverside Drive. In 1929, Roerich's work towards the pact was recognised through a nomination for the Nobel Peace Prize.

After leaving America, the Roerichs settled at Naggar in the Kullu Valley from which their estate looked towards the Himalayas. Here they established the Urusvati Institute which remains in Naggar with an exhibition about the pact. Nicholas Roerich died on 13 December 1947.

== Origins ==
An idea about the protection of cultural monuments was formulated for the first time by Nicholas Roerich in 1899. During his excavations at Saint-Petersburg province, Roerich began to point to the necessity of protection of cultural monuments, which reproduce a world-view of ancient people for us.

In 1903, Roerich together with his wife Helena Ivanovna Roerich toured through forty ancient Russian cities, including Yaroslavl, Kostroma, Kazan, Nizhny Novgorod, Vladimir, Suzdal, Yuriev-Polsky, Smolensk, Vilnius, Izborsk and Pskov. In 1904, proceeding the expedition, Nicholas Roerich has visited Uglich, Kalyazin, Kashin and Tver. During these travels Roerich created a large series of architectural studies, created near 90 paintings of the visited sites. Later many Russian churches were destroyed and these paintings remain the only documenting images.

Summarizing these trips, the painter admired the beauty of the ancient monuments. Roerich, expressing his feelings for the state of their protection, in his article "Along the old times" (1903): "Last summer I had an occasion to see many our true antique and little love to it".

In 1904, Roerich gave a report to the Emperor's Russian Archeological Society about the sad state of historical monuments and the necessity to take prompt actions to protect them.

During the Russo-Japanese War (1904–1905), Roerich expressed an idea about the necessity of a special treaty for the protection of institutions and cultural monuments. In the course of several years after his travel in 1903–1904, Roerich repeatedly pointed out the state of antique monuments. He wrote several articles dedicated to the poor state of the churches. In the article "Silent Pogroms" (1911) Roerich wrote about the unskillful restoration of St. John the Forerunner Church at Yaroslavl: "Who would defense a beautiful antique from mad pogroms? It is grievously when the antique dies. But it is more terrible when the antique remains disfigured, false, imitation ...".

In 1914, Roerich appealed to the high command of the Imperial Russian Army, as well as the governments of the United States and France with an idea of conclusion of an international agreement aimed on the protection of cultural values during armed conflicts. He created a poster "Enemy of Mankind" denouncing the barbaric destruction of cultural monuments, and picture "Glow" expressing a protest against World War I.

In 1915, Roerich wrote a report for Russian Emperor Nicholas II and Great Prince Nicholas Nikolayevich containing an appeal to make real state measures for national protection of cultural values.

In 1929, Roerich, in cooperation with G. G. Shklyaver (a.k.a. Georges Chklaver), a doctor of international law and political sciences at the University of Paris prepared a project of the Pact for protection of cultural values. Simultaneously Roerich proposed a distinctive sign to identify the objects that are in need of protection – the Banner of Peace. It consists of a white cloth with a red circle and three red circles inscribed in it.

== Draft and ratification ==
In 1929, Roerich, again in collaboration with Professor Shklyaver, prepared a draft of an international treaty dedicated to protection of cultural values. The scheme was to be a cultural analog to the Red Cross for medical neutrality.

In 1930, text of draft agreement with accompanying Roerich's appeal to governments and peoples of all countries was published in press and distributed in government, scientific, artistic and educational institutions of the whole world. As a result, the committees supporting the Pact were established in many countries. The draft pact was approved by Committee for Museum affairs at League of Nations and also by the Committee of the Pan-American Union. Ultimately, the Pact was signed by 21 states in the Americas and was ratified by ten of them.

In the aftermath of World War II, the Roerich Pact played an important role in forming of international law standards and public activity in the field of protection of cultural heritage. In 1949, at the fourth UNESCO General Conference, a decision was accepted to begin the work for international law regulation in the field of cultural heritage protection in case of armed conflict.

Ideas of Roerich Pact still are not implemented in the international law, especially its principle of the almost unlimited preference of the preservation of cultural values to the military necessity.

== Chronology ==
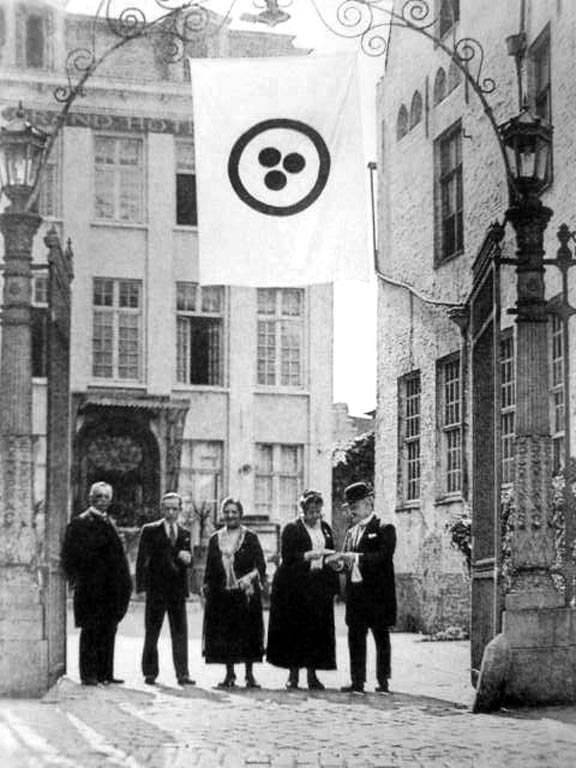
Delegates of Second international conference dedicated to the Roerich Pact. Bruges, August 1932.

From the book "Banner of Peace" /Compilers O.N. Zvonareva, T.O. Knizhnik, N.G. Mikhailova. – Second edition, supplemented and revised. – Moscow, ICR, 2005. – (series "Large Roerich's library").

1930 – A project together with N. Roerich's covering appeal to governments and peoples of all the countries was published and communicated to the governments, scientific, artistic and educational institutions of the world.

- Project of the Pact was represented to Committee on Museum affairs at League of Nations, and further it was referred to international committee for intellectual cooperation.
- Committees of the Roerich Pact and Banner of Peace were founded in Paris and Bruges (Belgium)

1931 – An International Union of the Roerich Pact was founded at Bruges under the guidance of a member of Belgium Committee for monument protection Camille Tulpinck.

- 13–15 September – first international conference dedicated to the Roerich Pact has been organized at Bruges. Representatives from group of European countries took part in this conference. A plan of promotion of the Pact ideas at educational institutes was developed, and contacts of International Union of the Roerich Pact with an International Committee for art affairs and Organization Committee for arms reduction were established.

1932, 7–9 September - second international conference dedicated to the Roerich Pact had been organized at Bruges. Twenty two countries took part in its work. The Conference has resolved to found at Bruges a special institute for world assistance to implementation of the Roerich Pact ideas in public life. It also took a decision to appeal to all the countries to recognize the Pact as international treaty.

1933, 15 November – Organizing Committee of third international Conference dedicated to the Roerich Pact visited the USA President F. Roosevelt.

- 17–18 November – Third international conference dedicated to the Roerich Pact was carried out in Washington. Thirty five countries have supported this conference and recommended the governments of all the countries to sign the Pact.
- December – 7th Pan-American Conference in Montevideo (Uruguay) has passed a resolution which recommended to the governments of American countries to join with the Roerich Pact.

1934, 4 April – A report of special committee of Pan-American Union dedicated to Roerich Pact was approved.

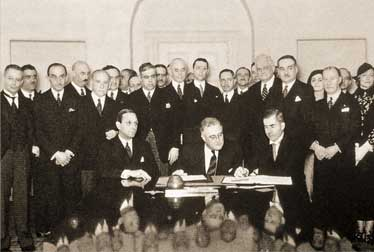
Signing of the Roerich's Pact (in centre: Franklin Delano Roosevelt)

- 11 August – USA President F Roosevelt has authorized a minister of agriculture Henry A. Wallace to sign the Roerich Pact from USA.
- 2 September – A Committee of the Pact and Banner of Peace was formed in Harbin (Manchuria).
- A Committee for promotion of the Pact was formed at Bulgaria.

1935, 15 April – A Treaty named "international pact for protection of artistic and scientific institutions, historic monuments, missions and collections" (Roerich Pact) is concluded and signed by representatives of 21 American states at the White House, Washington. A distinctive sign for identification of the protected objects (Banner of Peace) proposed by Roerich was approved in the frameworks of the Pact.

- 2 July – the Pact was ratified by USA Senate.
- 10 July – the Pact was ratified by USA President.
- 26 August – the Pact enters into legal force after being ratified by its second state party, Cuba.
- 25 October – the Pact was promulgated by USA President.

President F. Roosevelt talked in his radio speech: "Presenting this Pact for signing by all the countries, we strive for that its world acceptance becomes a vital principle for preserving of modern civilization. This agreement has more profound significance than the text of this document" [1].

1937, October – First Congress of Baltic Roerich societies has resolved to create the committees of Roerich Pact in all Roerich societies of Baltic countries.

- First congress of international research (Paris) unanimously accepted a resolution about joining to the Roerich Pact.

1938, 17 November – the Banner of Peace was spread out in Karachi (India).

1942 – The American-Russian culture association (ARCA) was formed in New York. Ernest Hemingway, Charlie Chaplin, Rockwell Kent, Norman Bel Geddes, Edmund Cooper, Serge Koussevitzky, Valeriy Ivanovich Tereshchenko were its active contributors. The association's activity was welcomed by world-known scientists Robert Andrews Millikan and Arthur Compton.

1946, 23 January – first meeting of resumed New York Committee of the Pact and Banner of Peace has been conducted.

- 18 April – 6th Pan-Indian conference for cultural unity has supported the Pact.

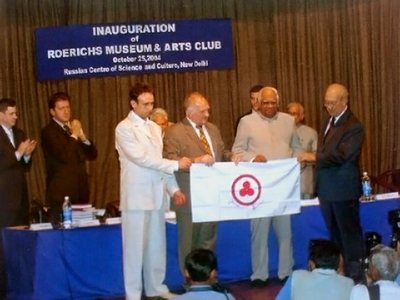
Presentation of Banner of Peace from the board of cosmic station "Mir" to Speaker of Indian Parliament Sri Somnath Chatterjee on the occasion of 100th S.N. Roerich anniversary. From left to right: Hero of the Russian Federation Sergei Zalyotin, Viktor Afanasyev, Sri Somnath Chatterjee, President of ICR Yuli Vorontsov.

1948, August – Indian government headed by Jawaharlal Nehru has decided to approve the Roerich Pact.

1948-1949 – Italian association of Roerich Pact at Bologna has organized the work to support the Pact on a broad footing. Committees of the Roerich Pact and Banner of Peace worked in Italy, Belgium, Switzerland, France, England, Portugal, Brazil, Columbia, Uruguay, Bolivia and Cuba.

1949 – 4th UNESCO general conference has taken a decision to begin a work for international-law regulation in the field of cultural values protection during the military actions.

1950 – A New York Committee of the Roerich Pact has transferred all the documentation about the Pact to UNESCO. 5th session of general UNESCO conference entrusted the general director with preparation and sending of a draft of convention. Special committee of UNESCO has prepared the draft of international convention in view of given documents.

1954, 14 May – U.N.O and UNESCO Conference in Hague has accepted the "Hague Convention for the Protection of Cultural Property in the Event of Armed Conflict" and a protocol accompanying it. The Second protocol to the Hague convention was accepted in March 1999 due to initiative and close participation of UNESCO. A text of the Hague convention pointed directly on that the base for it acceptance is a principle of cultural values protection during the war established at the Hague Conventions of 1899 and 1907 and also in the Roerich Pact. This Hague convention was signed by representatives from 37 countries.

1970, 14 November – "UNESCO Convention on the Means of Prohibiting and Preventing the Illicit Import, Export and Transfer of Ownership of Cultural Property" was accepted at 16th session of general UNESCO conference in Paris.

1972, 23 November – "Convention concerning the Protection of the World Cultural and Natural Heritage" was accepted at 17th session of general UNESCO conference in Paris.

1974 – Alpinists from Novosibirsk hoisted the Banner of Peace on the Roerich peak near Belukha Mountain (Altai).

1988, 6 May – Banner of Peace was hoisted at North Pole.

1990, 11 February – Soviet cosmonauts Aleksandr Balandin and Anatoly Solovyev took the Banner of Peace on the board of orbital station "Mir".

1995, 26 June – Banner of Peace was presented to Gebhardt von Moltke, deputy of secretary for political questions at NATO headquarters in Brussels.

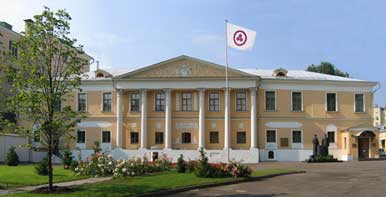
Banner of Peace over the Museum named after N. Roerich in Moscow

1997 – Banner of Peace was given to the crew of Soviet orbital station "Soyuz-TM" in the frameworks of scientific-enlightener project "Banner of Peace". It was delivered to orbital station "Mir" and remains in cosmos during two years (August 5, 1997 – August 28, 1999), accompanying the work of international crews.

1998, 9 October – Banner of Peace was hoisted over the Centre-Museum named after N. Roerich in Moscow.

1999, 5 January – Banner of Peace was presented to President of Kazakhstan Republic Nursultan Nazarbayev at President Palace (Almaty). Cosmonaut Alexei Leonov and Professor Sergey Kapitsa took part in the ceremony. - 26 March – Second protocol to "Convention for protection of cultural values in case of armed conflict" (Hague, 1954) was signed in Hague. The document was written by six languages: English, Arabic, Spanish, Chinese, Russian and French.

2000, 8 January – Banner of Peace was established at Southern Pole.

- 28 January – Banner of Peace from the Southern Pole was presented to U.N.O. General Secretary Kofi Annan as a gift from expedition centre "Arctic", International Centre of the Roerichs and the project "Banner of Peace".

2003, 17 October – The Convention about protection of non-material cultural heritage was accepted by 32nd session of the General UNESCO conference.

2004, 25 October – Banner of Peace from the board of cosmic station "Mir" was presented to Speaker of Indian Parliament Sri Somnath Chatterjee on the occasion of 100th Sviatoslav Roerich's Anniversary.

== Banner of Peace ==
The Pax Cultura emblem

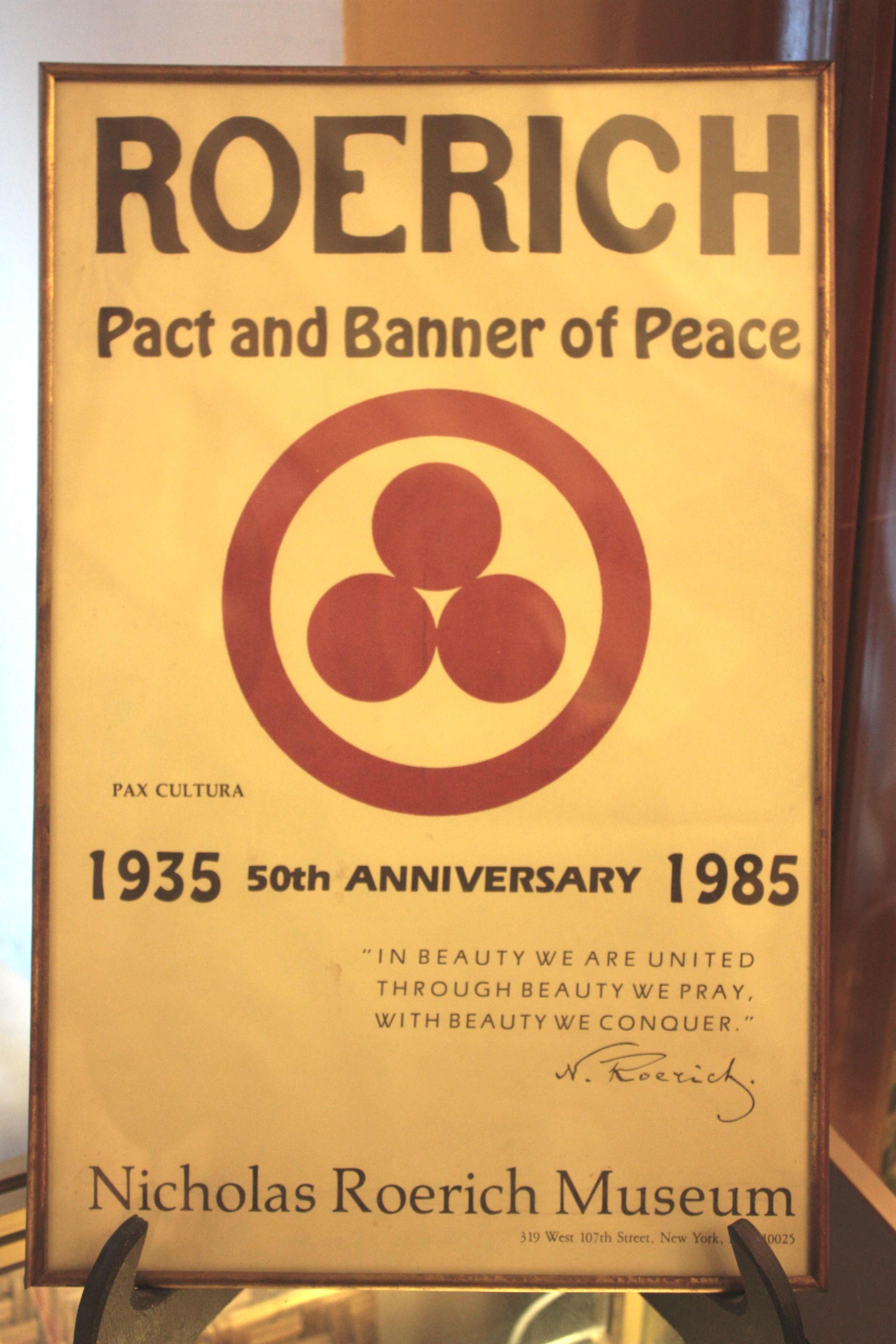
50 years of the Roerich Pact

"Pax Cultura" ("Cultural Peace" or "Peace through Culture") is the motto of the cultural artifact protection movement founded by Nicholas Roerich, and is symbolized by a maroon on white emblem consisting of three solid circles in a surrounding circle. On April 15, 1935, the Roerich Pact was signed by the United States and Latin American nations, agreeing that "historic monuments, museums, scientific, artistic, educational and cultural institutions" should be protected both in times of peace and war, and identified by their flying a distinctive flag, the Banner of Peace, bearing the Pax Cultura emblem.

According to the Roerich Museum, "The Banner of Peace symbol has ancient origins. Perhaps its earliest known example appears on Stone Age amulets: three dots, without the enclosing circle. Roerich came across numerous later examples in various parts of the world, and knew that it represented a deep and sophisticated understanding of the triune nature of existence. But for the purposes of the Banner and the Pact, Roerich described the circle as representing the totality of culture, with the three dots being Art, Science, and Religion, three of the most embracing of human cultural activities. He also described the circle as representing the eternity of time, encompassing the past, present, and future. The sacred origins of the symbol, as an illustration of the trinities fundamental to all religions, remain central to the meaning of the Pact and the Banner today."

The Roerich Pact sign was superseded by the distinctive marking of cultural property as defined by the Hague Convention of 1954. However, the emblem of the Roerich Pact is still a valid protective sign in the relations between the ten states which are bound by the Pact.

== World League of Culture and World Day of Culture ==
In the broad sense the Roerich Pact is understood as not only a legal treaty but also as a whole complex of measures for the protection of cultural values suggested by N. Roerich. Consequently, the Roerich Pact has not only legal but also philosophic, enlightening, and evolutional significance since it reflects an idea of cultural protection in its many manifestations.

Characterizing the Roerich Pact, cosmonaut Alexei Leonov wrote:

If we are raising a culture and spirituality then it will help us to strengthen an economics, to make the policy moral and to stop the military conflicts. This is a significance of the Roerich Pact today. The more time is passed the more actual for the world it becomes. ...

Developing the Pact ideas N. Roerich has stated the thoughts about a role of community. The laws for culture protection in itself will not work if the community will not display an activity and interest to this. Later this thought was supported by academician D. S. Likhachev. He said:

... I believe that the best and freely developing social forms of culture can unite creative constructive forces and improve a social life, thereby help the state to maintain high ideals of humanism and peacefulness in the people. ...

At the first international conference of Roerich Pact in Bruges (September, 1931), N. Roerich proposed to create a World League of Culture. One of main aims of the League must be to train care of the nature.

In his article "Pain of the Planet" (1933) N. Roerich wrote: "The call about culture, call about the world, and call about creativity and beauty reaches the ear which is strengthen by true values only. Understanding of life as self-improving for the people's good arises where the respect of the nature is valid. Therefore, the League of Culture together with main enlightener activity must wholesale explain a wise regard for the nature as an origin of merry work, wise joy, continuous cognition and creativity".

The cultural community highly appreciates N. Roerich's thought about the implementation of World Day of Culture. N. Roerich wrote: "... We shall hear about the world Day of Culture too when at all schools and enlightener societies simultaneously the day will dedicated to comprehension of the national and world cultural treasures ..."

== See also ==
- Agni Yoga
- Banner of Peace
- Roerichism
