= World Art Day =

International celebration of fine art

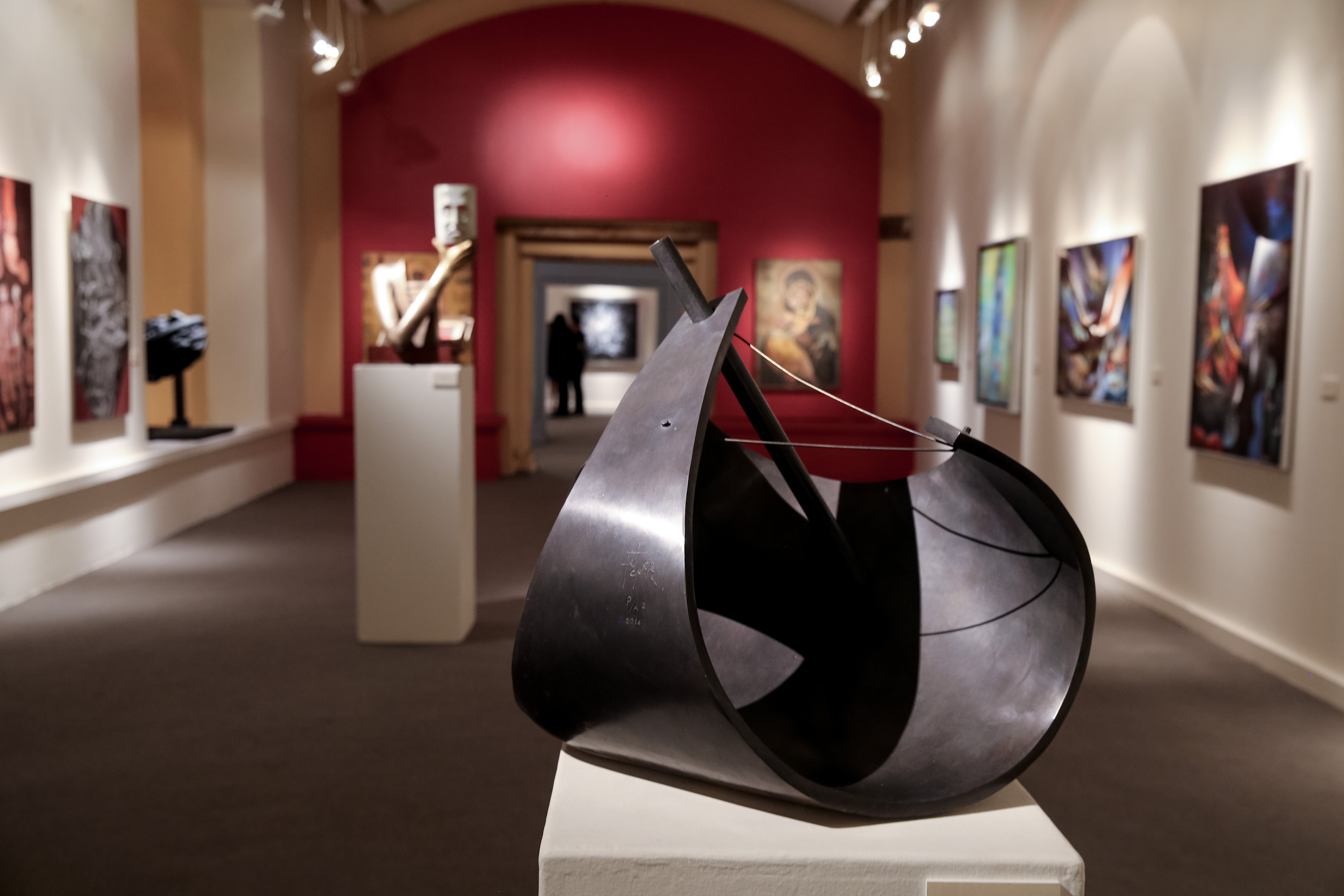
José Luis Cuevas Museum on World Art Day, 2017

World Art Day is an international celebration of the fine arts that was declared by the International Association of Art (IAA) in order to promote awareness of creative activity worldwide.

== Establishment ==
A proposal was put forward at the 17th General Assembly of the International Association of Art in Guadalajara to declare April 15 as World Art Day, with the first celebration held in 2012. This proposal was sponsored by Bedri Baykam of Turkey and co-signed by Rosa Maria Burillo Velasco of Mexico, Anne Pourny of France, Liu Dawei of China, Christos Symeonides of Cyprus, Anders Liden of Sweden, Kan Irie of Japan, Pavel Kral of Slovakia, Dev Chooramun of Mauritius, and Hilde Rognskog of Norway. It was accepted unanimously by the General Assembly.

The date was decided in honor of the birthday of Leonardo da Vinci. Leonardo was chosen as a symbol of world peace, freedom of expression, tolerance, brotherhood and multiculturalism as well as art’s importance to other fields.

== Past celebrations ==
The first World Art Day on April 15, 2012, was supported by all IAA national committees and 150 artists, including those of France, Sweden, Slovakia, South Africa, Cyprus and Venezuela, but the intention of the event is universal. Events varied from special museum hours to conferences and more. For example Venezuela held outdoor art exhibitions with paintings, sculptures, prints, video and more, as well as a Florentine cooking demonstration in honor of Leonardo.

More events were held in 2013 all over the world including the Mbombela municipal art museum in South Africa. However, there was controversy at celebrations in Sweden when the Swedish minister of Culture, Lena Adelsohn Liljeroth, cut into the genitals of a cake representing a black African woman. The performance art was meant to be a statement against genital mutilation but many found the depiction racist.

World Art Day has also been supported online, especially by the Google Art Project.

== See also ==
- Universal Day of Culture
