= Banner of Peace =

Symbol of an international treaty protecting cultural goods

The Banner of Peace
- Adopted: 1935
- Relinquished: 1945
- Design: A white flag with three amaranth spheres in an empty circle.
- Designed by: Nicholas Roerich

Emblem of the Banner of Peace

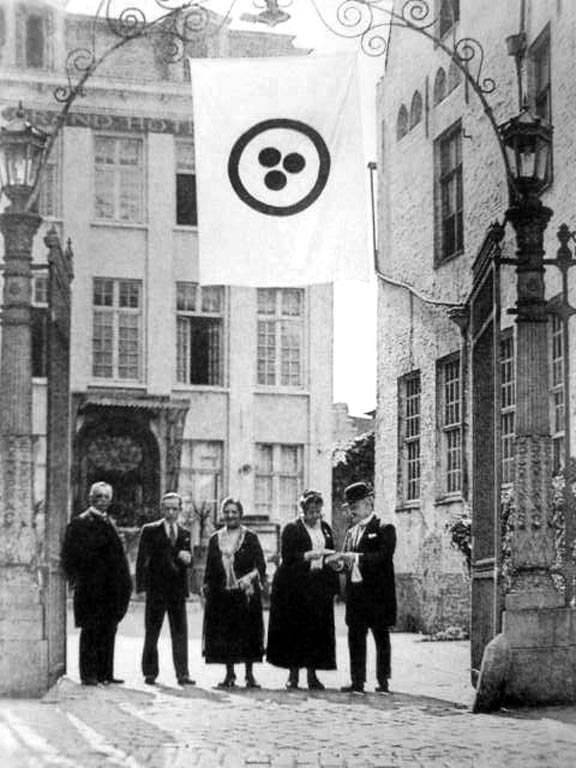
Delegates of second international conference dedicated to the Roerich Pact. Bruges, August 1932. Above them hangs a banner of peace.

The Banner of Peace is a symbol associated with the Roerich Pact, the first international treaty aimed at the protection of artistic and scientific institutions and historical monuments. The pact, signed on April 15, 1935, represents a significant milestone in the international effort to safeguard cultural values and heritage. The Banner of Peace was proposed by Nicholas Roerich, a prominent figure in the development of the pact, as a universal emblem to signify protected cultural sites under the agreement.

== Description ==
Roerich described the sign thus:

"[the] proposed banner is the symbol of whole world, not a country, but the whole civilized world. The Banner proposed has on the white background three united amaranth spheres as a symbol of Eternity and Unity. Although we don't know when this Banner will fly over all cultural monuments but undoubtedly the seed has been sprouted. Already it attracts the attention of great intellects and is directed from one heart to another, awaking the idea of Peace and Benevolence among peoples."

"We are asked to collect where the signs of our Banner of Peace are. The sign of trinity is found scattered around the whole world. Now anybody can explain it by various ways. One says that it is the past, present and future united by the circle of eternity. Others explain it as a religion, knowledge and art in the circle of culture."

The following description of the sign appears in the official text of the pact:

"In order to identify the monuments and institutions mentioned in article I, use may be made of a distinctive flag (red circle with a triple red sphere in the circle on a white background) in accordance with the model attached to this treaty."

== Origin ==
In the text of the pact, Roerich wrote:

"The Banner of Peace, as is now well-known, is the symbol of the Roerich Pact. This great humanitarian ideal provides in the field of mankind's cultural achievements the same guardianship as the Red Cross provides in alleviating the physical sufferings of man."

The origin of Roerich's idea for the creation of the Banner of Peace sign was an ancient Russian icon by Andrei Rublev. Roerich wrote about this in his letter to Baron M.A. Taube:

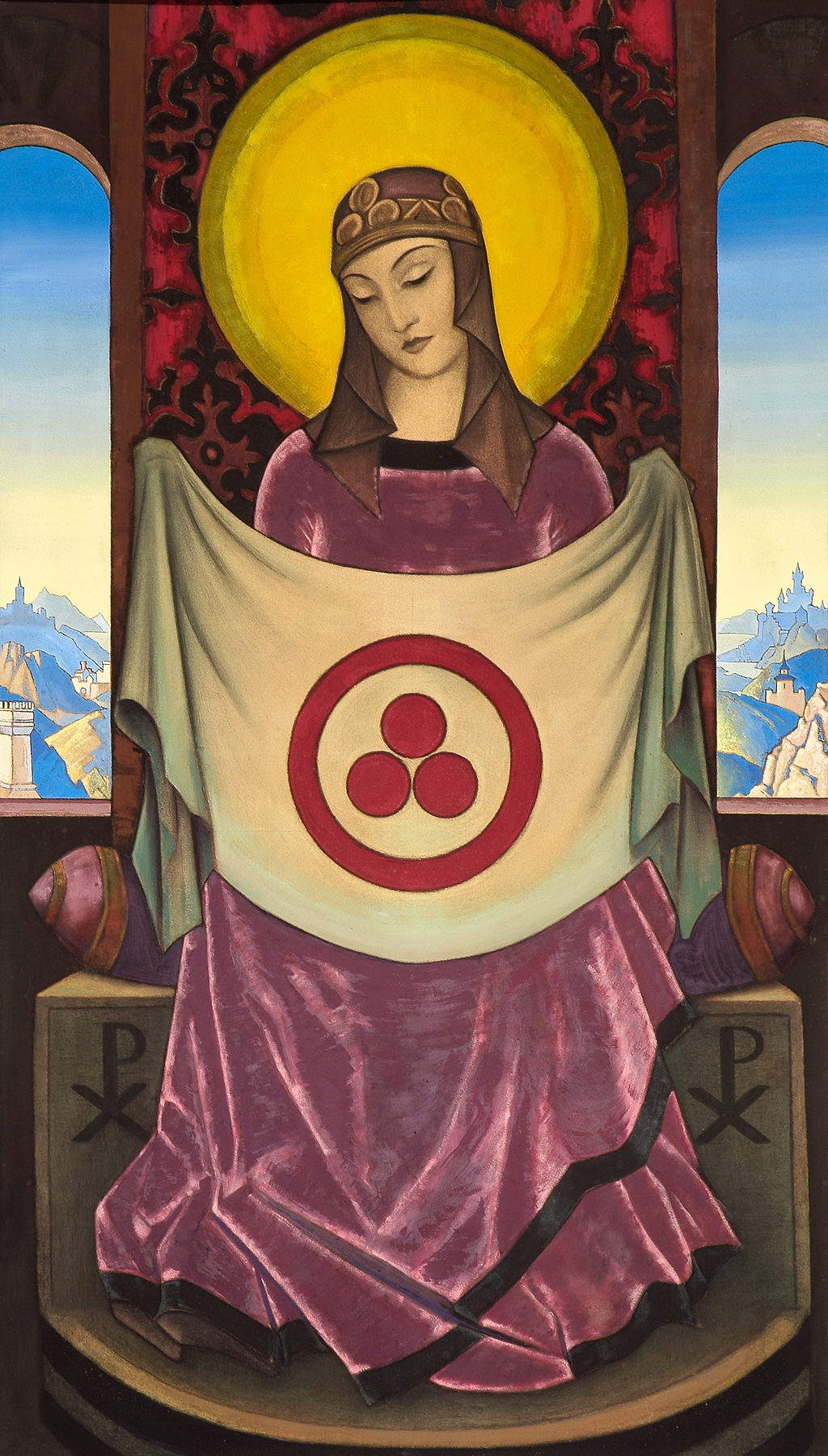
Madonna Oriflamma by Nicholas Roerich, 1932.

"At last I can send you a home photo of my last picture dedicated to meaning sense of the banner sign. You can show this photo to some committee members and also to anybody whom, as you believe, it may be useful. Say to all ignoramuses which try to substitute their self-interested and ill-intentioned explanations of the sense of this picture. What may be more ancient and more genuine than Byzantine conception which stretches in the depth of centuries to the origin united Christianity and so beautifully implemented in Rublev's icon "Saint life-giving Trinity" from the Holy Trinity-St. Sergius Lavra? Just this symbol – the symbol of ancient Christianity, consecrated for us by name of St. Sergius, gives me a hint to our sign. Its sense is expressed on the proposed photo with conservation of all elements and their positions according to the Rublev's icon. Let this photo will be with You at Paris in the case of any new attempts to destroy already existing. In addition, I send You a photo of St. Queen of the Banner – Madonna Oriflamma." (Letter from N.K. Roerich to Baron M. Taube, 13.02.1932.)

N.K. Roerich has adduced the following illustrations of presence of the Banner of Peace components in the pictures and icons of great spiritual devotees from various religions:

"Our post from various countries today brings us much news about the propagation of our Pact for protection of cultural values. We have received a copy of an ancient icon of St Nicholas the Miracle-Worker <…>, which is confirmed to printing by metropolitan Antony. From other regions we have received a photo of an edition of Kiev-Pecherskaya Laura press from 1860 of the service to Venerable Sergius of Radonezh, the Miracle-Worker. From Spain we have received a picture of St. Domingo from "Silos" (archaeological museum, Madrid). Also from Spain we have received a picture of St. Michael made by Bartolommeo Vermekho (1440). At all these pictures the sign of Banner of Peace can be seen. It is useful to remember this for many."

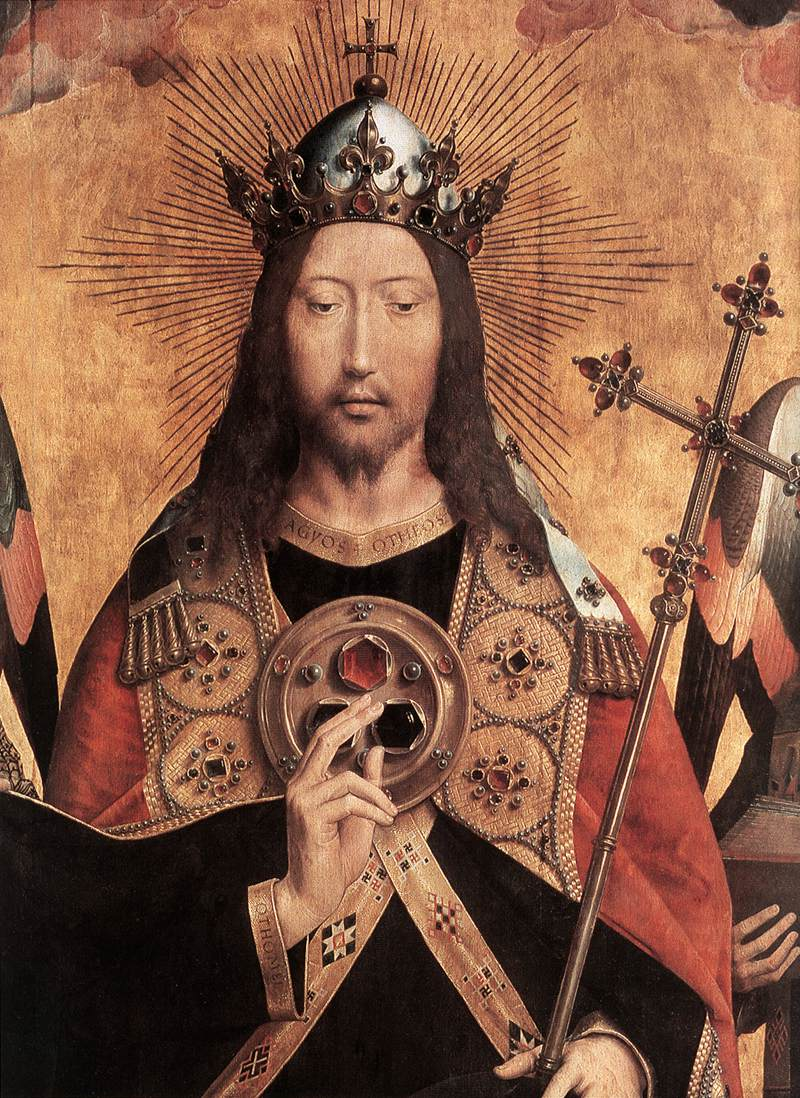
Detail of Christ with Singing Angels, by Hans Memling, around 1480.

"The sign of the banner was also found at the Temple of Heaven. "Tamga" of Tamerlane consists of the same sign. The sign of Three Treasures is well known for many countries of the East. On the chest of Tibetan women one can see a large fibula (brooch) which is the sign. The same fibulas we see also in Caucasian findings and in Scandinavia. Madonna of Strasbourg has the same sign as well as the Spanish Saints. The same sign is on the icons of St. Sergius and St. Nicholas Miracle-Worker. The sign as a large breast fibula is depicted on Christ's breast on the well-known H. Memling's picture. When we go over sacramental pictures of Byzantine, Roma, the same symbol ties the sacramental pictures on over the world."

== Conditions of using the banner of peace sign ==
The monuments and institutions, on which the banner of peace sign is proposed to establish, must be included by National governments in the special list.

=== Article IV ===
The signatory Governments and those which accede to this treaty, shall send to the Pan American Union, at the time of signature or accession, or at any time thereafter, a list of the monuments and institutions for which they desire the protection agreed to in this treaty. The Pan American Union, when notifying the Governments of signatures or accessions, shall also send the list of monuments and institutions mentioned in this article, and shall inform the other Governments of any changes in said list.

=== Article V ===
The monuments and institutions mentioned in article I shall cease to enjoy the privileges recognized in the present treaty in case they are made use of for military purposes.

Roerich wrote about these conditions:

"Institutions, collections and missions, registered under Roerich Pact, exhibit a distinctive flag which gives them the right to special protection and respect from belligerent countries and peoples of all countries participating in the treaty."

It is seen from above words that in order to get the right for exhibition of the distinctive banner one must be registered by Pact bodies. The same standing exists concerning a distinctive banner of the Red Cross (which also created on the basis of ancient symbol – cross).

== Important cultural events with the Banner of Peace ==
In 1990, Russian cosmonauts Aleksandr Balandin and Anatoly Solovyev performed a space flight on orbital station Mir with the banner of peace on board. This flight lasted from February to August, including nine days with the banner outside the craft, completing 144 orbits of the Earth.

An international scientific "banner of peace" project was conducted in 1997, with the banner of peace again delivered into the orbiting Mir. The aim of this action was to call for protecting life and beauty on Earth. Many international crews worked in Mir with the banner aboard. Cosmonaut Pavel Vinogradov, a participant of the project, said:

"We have raised the banner of peace over the Earth in order that a space of culture excludes the space of war and animosity forever. We call all the peoples and nations to building of new spiritual, scientific and artistic cooperation."

After completing the project and returning from orbit, the banner of peace was passed to the International Centre of the Roerichs. It is now exhibited there.

On January 5, 1999, the banner of peace was presented to President Nursultan Nazarbayev of Kazakhstan. Cosmonaut Alexei Leonov and professor S.P. Kapitsa participated in the ceremony, which was conducted in the Presidential Palace in Almaty.

Mountaineers have lifted the banner of peace over many mountain peaks. Among these are the following:

- Elbrus;
- Belukha, Roerich peak, Urusvati peak, Svetoslav Roerich peak (Altai);
- Khan-Tengri (Middle Asia);
- Everest (Himalayas)

The banner of peace was first raised at the North Pole by the traveler Fyodor Konyukhov in 1988. In 1999, participants of the first international complex Antarctic expedition "Towards to XXI" raised the banner of peace at the South Pole. The banners from these expeditions are now exhibited in the International Centre of the Roerichs.

In October, 2004 during the celebration of Roerich's 100th anniversary, the banner of peace which had been to the space station was presented to the Indian Parliament. Taking the banner, Speaker S. Chatterji said:

"It will be kept in the library of the Indian Parliament as most precious treasure."

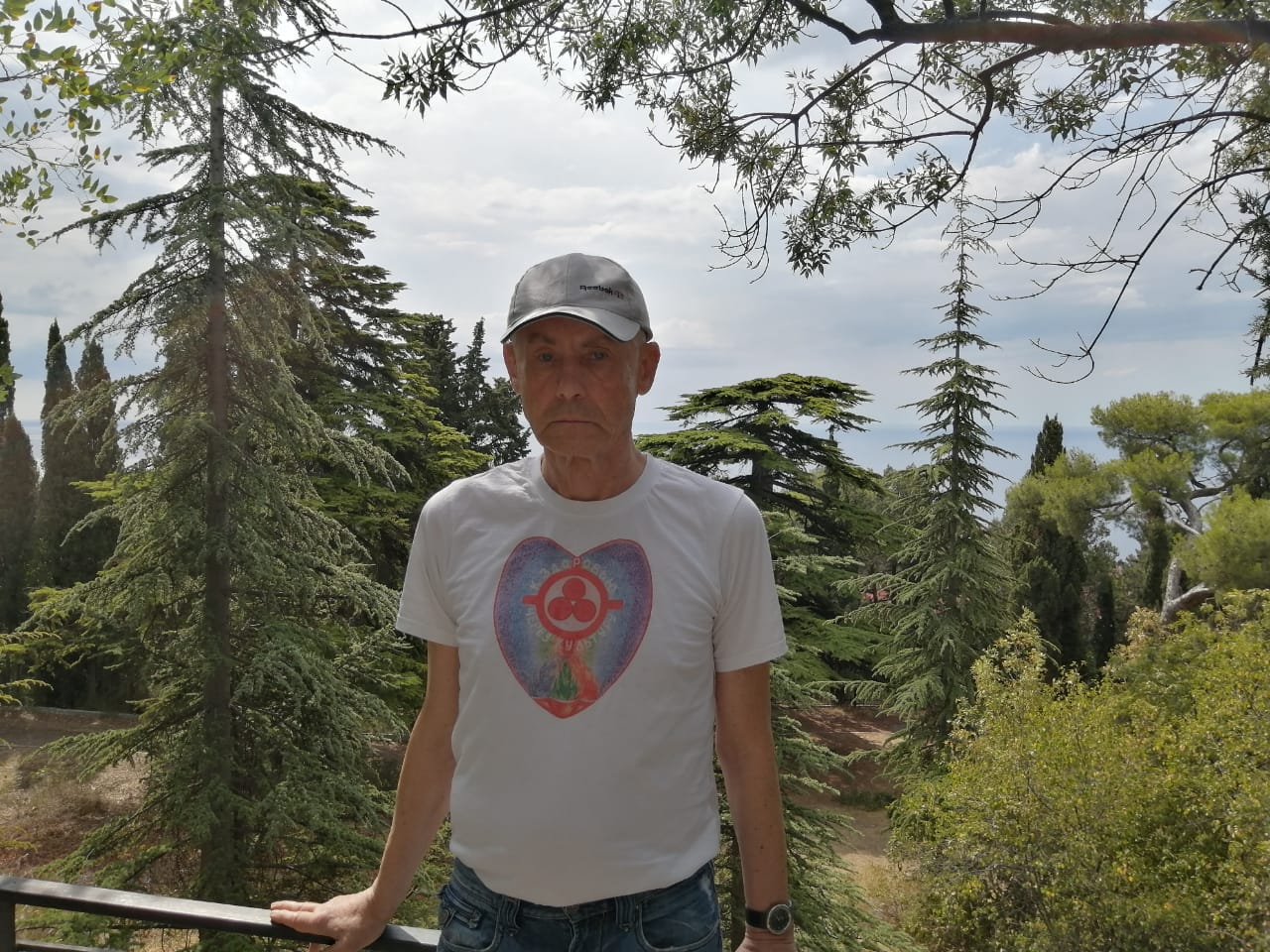
Victor Skumin, the president-founder of the WOCH

The Banner of Peace is included in the structure of the coats of arms of some institutions and public organizations. Among them the Nicholas Roerich Museum in New York City, The World Organisation of Culture of Health, International non-governmental organisation "International Centre of the Roerichs", etc.

== Relevant papers by Roerich ==
- The Banner (February 6, 1932)
- The Banner (April 15, 1935)
- The Banner of Peace (May 24, 1939)
- The Banner of Peace (October 25, 1945)
- Our Banner (February 15, 1946)
- To friends of Banner of Peace (June 1, 1947)

== See also ==
- Blue Shield International – International organization protecting cultural heritage

== Notes ==
- 11. The Banner of Peace

== See also ==
- Agni Yoga
- Culture of Peace
- Peace flag
- Peace movement
- Peace symbols
- Roerichism
