= Nicholas Roerich Museum =

Museum in Manhattan, New York

Coordinates: 40°48′10.3″N 73°58′8.6″W

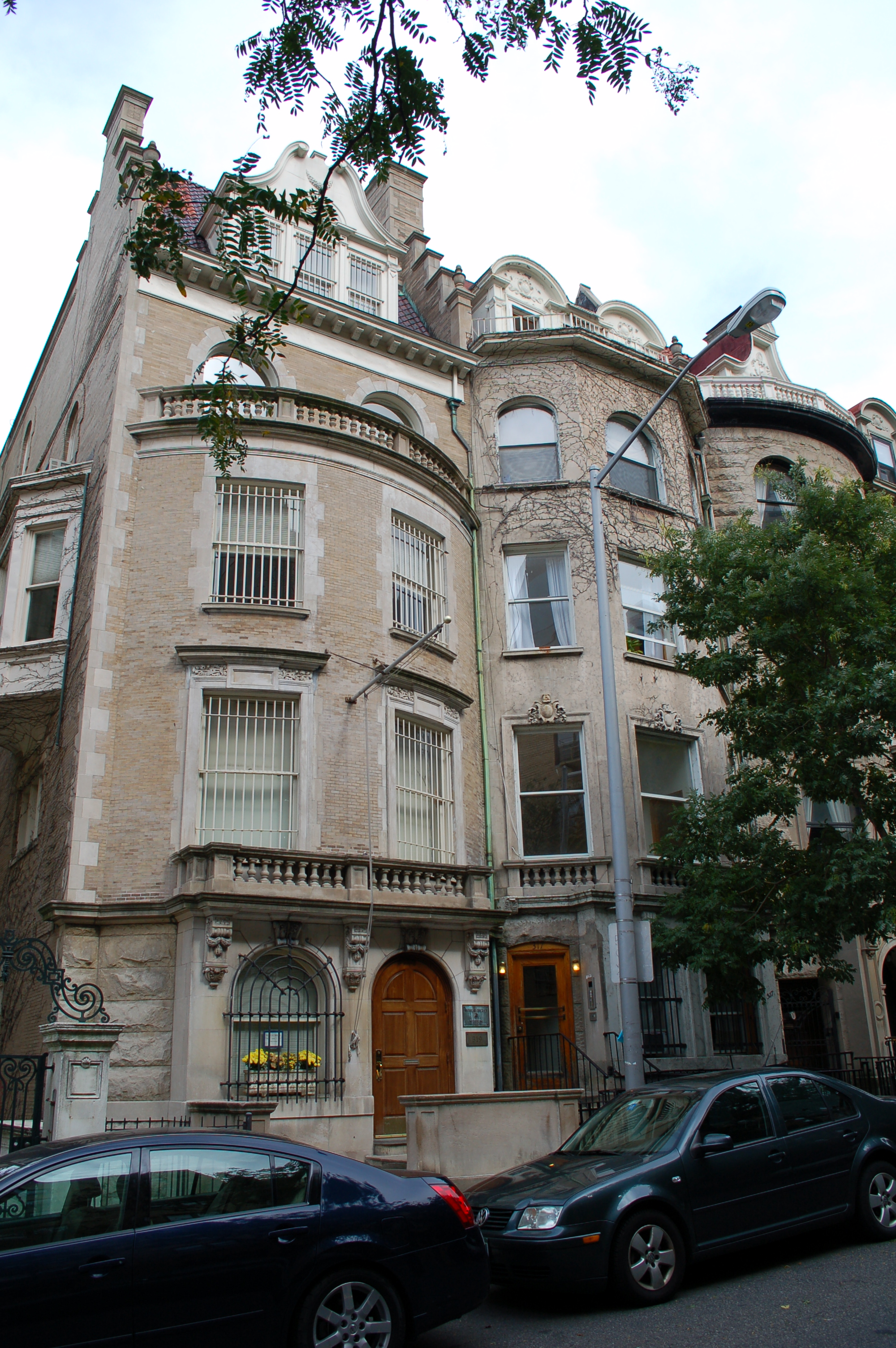
The Roerich Museum in Manhattan, 2009

The Nicholas Roerich Museum is a museum on the Upper West Side of Manhattan in New York City, dedicated to the works of Nicholas Roerich (1874–1947), a Russian-born cosmopolitan artist.

His early accomplishments include devising with Igor Stravinsky the libretto, and creating the sets and costumes for the “Rite of Spring” (1913).

He spent the last 20 years of his life in Kullu valley in the Western Himalayas, and is famous for his many landscapes of the Himalayas.

Housed in a brownstone at 319 West 107th Street, the museum was originally located in the nearby Master Apartments at 103rd Street and Riverside Drive, which were built for Nicholas Roerich and Helena Roerich in 1929.

The museum includes approximately 150 of Roerich's works as well as a collection of archival materials.

== See also ==
- Agni Yoga
- Banner of Peace
- Russian cosmism
- Roerichism
- List of single-artist museums
