= Richard Rudzitis =

Soviet writer and poet (1898–1960)

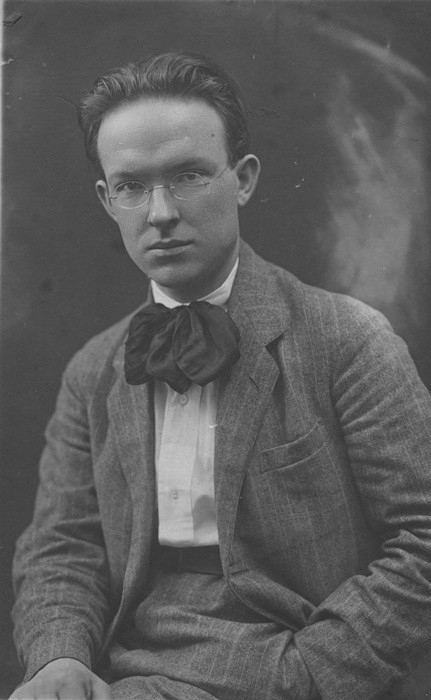
- Rudzitis in 1921
- Born: February 19, 1898; Melluzi, Russian Empire
- Died: November 5, 1960 (aged 62); Riga, Latvian SSR
- Resting place: Riga, Latvia
- Education: University of Tartu, University of Latvia
- Occupations: poet, writer, translator, philosopher, public figure
- Spouse: Ella Rudzite
- Children: Gunta, Ilze, Maria

Richard Rudzitis (Latvian: Rihards Rudzītis; February 19, 1898 – November 5, 1960) was a Latvian and Soviet poet, writer, translator and philosopher. He was chairman of the Latvian Roerich Cultural Relations Association from 1936 to 1940.

== Biography ==
Richard Rudzitis was born on February 19, 1898, in the village of Melluzi, in a peasant family. He taught himself to read, and loved books all his life. He graduated from the local gymnasium, continued his studies at the University of Tartu (1916–1918) at the Department of Philology. Subsequently, he learned seven languages. In 1920, he entered the Department of Philosophy at the University of Latvia, where Rudzitis graduated in 1931 with a thesis "About the category of the beauty and the goodness" / "The Metaphysical Aspect of Beauty".

From his student years (other sources – from 1918) he worked at the State Library of Riga: he headed the departments, consulted, reviewed, and conducted scientific research. During World War I, he worked in the library, wrote the book "The Brotherhood of the Grail", and accomplished the return of Nicholas Roerich's paintings to the Society. Under Stalin, he refused to join the Writers' Union, so that he would not have to curry favor with the "Master". Authorities banned six of his books (Germany banned one).

On April 18, 1948, he was arrested as an "enemy of the people" due to a letter he sent to the Theosophical Society in Moscow; never accepted this condemnation. He was able to hide and preserve the manuscripts and documents of the Latvian Roerich Society in time. He served his term in the strictest Komi regime camps (Inta, Abez), where he continued to write poetry, articles and other works with a chemical pencil on rags, stitching them into a pea coat. He returned from the camps at the end of 1954 as a complete invalid, occasionally earning money from translations of scientific texts and literary works. From 1957 to 1960 he met George de Roerich many times. Rudzitis wrote a book about Nicholas Roerich entitled "Cosmic strings in the works of Nicholas Roerich". The manuscript was approved by George de Roerich.

Rudzitis died in the midst of his work; his heart grieved the bitter news of the sudden death of George de Roerich. He was buried at the Forest Cemetery in Riga, Latvia. On the granite stone, in the shape of the flame, a flaming bowl of the Grail warrior is carved, and under it the words: "Hurry up to the morning".

== Family ==
His wife (from 1926), Ella Rudzite, (January 6, 1900 – c. 1993), actress, member of the Roerich society from March 15, 1931, led the group from April 28, 1935, also went through the camps. Their first daughter, Gunta (b. May 13, 1933), a library worker, philologist, art critic, accompanied her father to meetings with George de Roerich, the author of articles about Nicholas Roerich, from 1988 the chairman of the recreated Society, had prepared many works of her father for publication. The second daughter is Ilze (b. January 24, 1937), an artist in Barnaul, Russia. The third is Maria (b. April 1, 1939), a doctor.

== Literary works ==
The 1920–1930s were the heyday of Rudzitis' poetic work. He wrote poetry without much editing. He composed songs, and they were translated into foreign languages. Rudzitis wrote about 400 poems.

From 1917, he began to regularly publish his poems, with oriental motifs immediately emerging. The first book of poems is called "Songs of Man" (1922). This was followed by a collection of poems "To the Beautiful Soul" (1933 and 1934) and the poetic anthologies he collected in it "In the Temple" (1925), "The Book of Mother" (1932) also included excerpts from the Teaching of Agni Yoga and statements of Western and Eastern writers). In 1918 he published the first translations of 12 verses by Rabindranath Tagore, in 1923 he published a brochure on his work "Solar Culture". On June 19, 1921, he sent a letter to Tagore and received a response. All in all, Rudzitis published 15 articles on Tagore, translations of 133 of his poems, five dramas and several philosophical works. He translated the Bhagavad Gita, Upanishads, Vivekananda, Saadi, Rumi and European poets. In 1927 he published translations of the poetry of Greece "Melodies of the Bees". He wrote articles about Greek culture, India, Mahatma Gandhi, and about the Indian scholar Jagadish Bose.

== Participation in the Latvian Roerich Society ==
At the end of the 1920s The Latvian Roerich Society invited Rudzitis, as a sensitive translator and connoisseur of oriental culture, to become the editor of the Agni Yoga book translations. When the Society was officially registered in 1930, he was already one of its active members. Rudzitis found what he had been looking for, for many years. From 1930, Fyodor D. Lukin was the chairman of the Latvian Roerich Society for 6 years. After Lukun's death in 1936, Rudzitis was unanimously elected chairman and led the Society until 1940. In the fall of 1940, the Roerich Society was disbanded, however Rudzitis continued his work, "The Brotherhood of the Holy Grail", during the war and after the war.

In 1935, Rudzitis's book "Nicholas Roerich – the Guide of Culture" ("Nicholas Roerich. Peace through Culture") was published. This book highlights the activities of Nicholas Roerich in the 1920s and 1930s. In 1957, the son of Nicholas Roerich transmitted to Rudzitis the wish of Helena Roerich to write a book about the work of Nicholas Roerich. In 1960, George de Roerich approved the manuscript of the book "Cosmic Strings in the Works of Nicholas Roerich", written by Rudzitis. About 50 books were published by the "Uguns" publishing house of the Latvian Roerich Society. Rudzitis was the head, editor, proofreader, and often translator of this publishing house. You can find many good words about Rudzitis in Helena Roerich's dairy. Under the leadership of Rudzitis, the Society published the works of the Roerichs, Living Ethics, H. P. Blavatsky's Secret Doctrine and the works of Rudzitis himself. "A scientist and a poet, such a combination is rare, but you have it, your work and your scientific nature is remarkable", – Helena Roerich wrote.

"Thank you for the joy your new book gave to us", Nicholas Roerich wrote after receiving Rudzitis' work "The Awareness of Beauty Will Save the World" – truly, not only is it rich in thoughts and the way the message is delivered, but it is also the clearness of mind that makes this book attractive. It is so valuable that such clear ideological books are being published and I can only wish for it to spread among wider social groups. The book must go to school libraries. It must find a way to foreign countries, so that people elsewhere know what keeps the spiritual fire of Latvia. Thank you one more time for this celebration of the spirit". Rudzitis wrote about Nicholas Roerich: "What is especially very attractive to us in the personality of Roerich is that he is not just a thinker, a prophet or a dreamer, he has not told any idea that you could not realize and in whose realization he had not already laid the foundation. He has established the base of many beginnings, cultural institutions that are so monumental that they make people remember the great creators of the past". ("Nicholas Roerich – The Herald of Culture").

== Works ==
- Cilveka dziesmas (1922);
- Saules kultura (R. Tagor, 1923);
- Dailajai Dveselei (1933);
- Svetcelotaja piezimes. Riga: Jana Rapas apgads, 1929.;
- Atzineji un cinitaji (1935);
- Nikolajs Rerihs, kulturas celvedis (1935), Russian: Культура (1936), English: Culture (1937);
- Dailuma apzina pestis (1936), Russian: Красота (1936)
