= Gö Lotsawa Zhönnu-pel =

4th Gyalwang Drukpa (1392–1481)

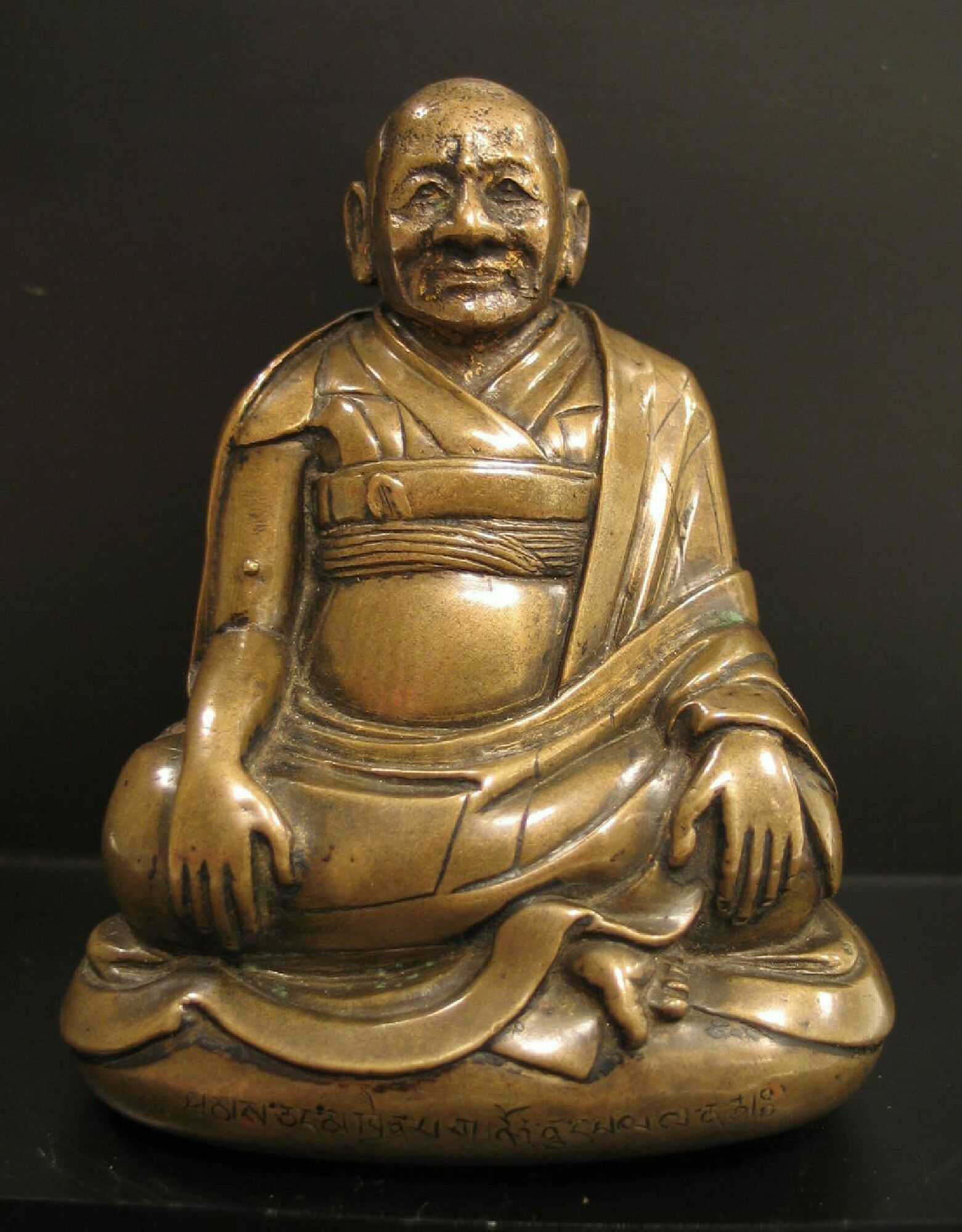
Go Lotsawa (b.1392 - d.1481) - famous Tibetan historian

gZhon-nu-dpal (1392-1481), also known as 'Gos Lo-tsa-ba (full name: Yid-bzang-rtse gZhon-nu-dpal) was a famous Tibetan historian and scholar, known as the author of the "Blue Annals".

== Life and achievements ==
He was born in 1392 at lho kha 'phyongs rgyas. He was a student of the fifth Karmapa Lama, Deshin Shekpa (1384-1415), from whom he received the bodhisattva precepts, as well as Tsongkhapa, and was a teacher of the sixth Karmapa, Thongwa Dönden (1416-1453). He was the abbot of the Karmarñing Monastery and the author of the Blue Annals.

== Works ==
- His most famous work, the "Blue Annals" (Deb-ther sngon-po), was completed in 1478, near the end of his life, and the text was dictated by him to some of his attendants.
- 'Khrul-sel, written in 1442-1443.
- His wrote a commentary on the Ratnagotravibhaga which extensively explored and contrasted Buddha-nature, described by Mathes (2008).

== Sources ==
- Roerich, George N.; Gedun Choepel (1949). The Blue Annals (1998 reprint ed.). Delhi: Motilal Banarsidass. ISBN 81-208-0471-6.
