= Hermann Schmiechen =

German painter (1855–c.1923/25)

- Born: 22 July 1855; Neumarkt, Prussian Silesia
- Died: c. 1923 or c. 1925; Berlin, Germany
- Citizenship: Germany
- Education: Kunstakademie Düsseldorf
- Occupations: Painter (Note: "Painter. Portraits, local figures, genre scenes."); Theosophist
- Spouse: Antonia (Antonie) Gebhard

Hermann Schmiechen (22 July 1855 – c. 1923 or 1925) was a German portrait painter and Theosophist.

== Biography ==
Hermann Schmiechen was born in Neumarkt, Prussian Silesia. In 1872, he entered the Royal Academy of Arts and Crafts at Breslau, where he studied with Albrecht Bräuer (1830–1897). In 1873, he shifted into Düsseldorf school of painting and became student of Karl Müller and Eduard von Gebhardt, and was also a member of the artists association Malkasten. After studying at the Kunstakademie Düsseldorf, he learned in Paris at the Académie Julian.

In 1883, on the recommendation of August Becker, Schmichen, almost simultaneously with Karl Rudolf Sohn, was invited into England to paint portraits of the British aristocracy. From 1884 to 1895 he was a member of the Royal Academy of Arts.

=== Theosophical portraits ===
On June 20, 1884, a year after arriving in London, Schmiechen became a member the Theosophical Society. Then, fulfilling the request of Helena Blavatsky, he began to paint portraits of the Theosophical mahatmas. The portrait of the mahatma Koot Hoomi she assessed as "excellent" and immediately asked Schmiechen to begin working on a portrait of the mahatma Morya. It took him about three weeks, (Note: "From June 19 to July 9, 1884.") to complete these paintings. (Note: "There are various accounts of the production of the Schmiechen portraits, yet all agree that the works are the result of inspiration.") (Note: "Hermann Schmiechen... agreed to take part in a 'psychical experiment' to see if images could be transferred to his mind from those who had seen the Masters.")

The Russian writer Vsevolod Solovyov reported his impression of the portraits of the Theosophical mahatmas as follows:

"Subsequently, when I had thoroughly examined these portraits, I found in them much that was unsatisfactory from an artistic point of view; but their life-likeness was remarkable, and the eyes of the two mysterious strangers gazed straight at the spectator, their lips could almost have been said to move... Schmiechen had painted two beautiful young men. Mahatma Koot Hoomi, clad in a graceful sort of robe, trimmed with fur, had a tender, almost feminine face and gazed sweetly with a pair of charming light eyes. But as soon as one looked at 'the master' [of Blavatsky], Koot Hoomi, for all his tender beauty, was at once forgotten. The fiery black eyes of the tall Morya fixed themselves sternly and piercingly upon one, and it was impossible to tear oneself away from them."

In 1901, Schmiechen, returning into Germany, settled in Berlin and joined the German section of the Theosophical Society.

== Paintings ==
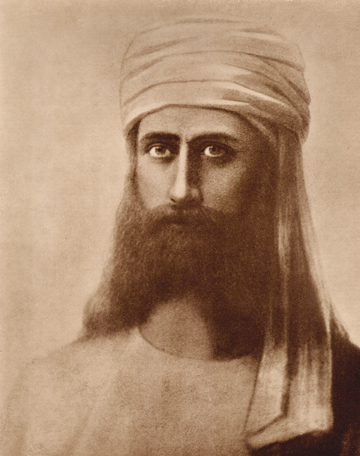
Portrait of Morya.

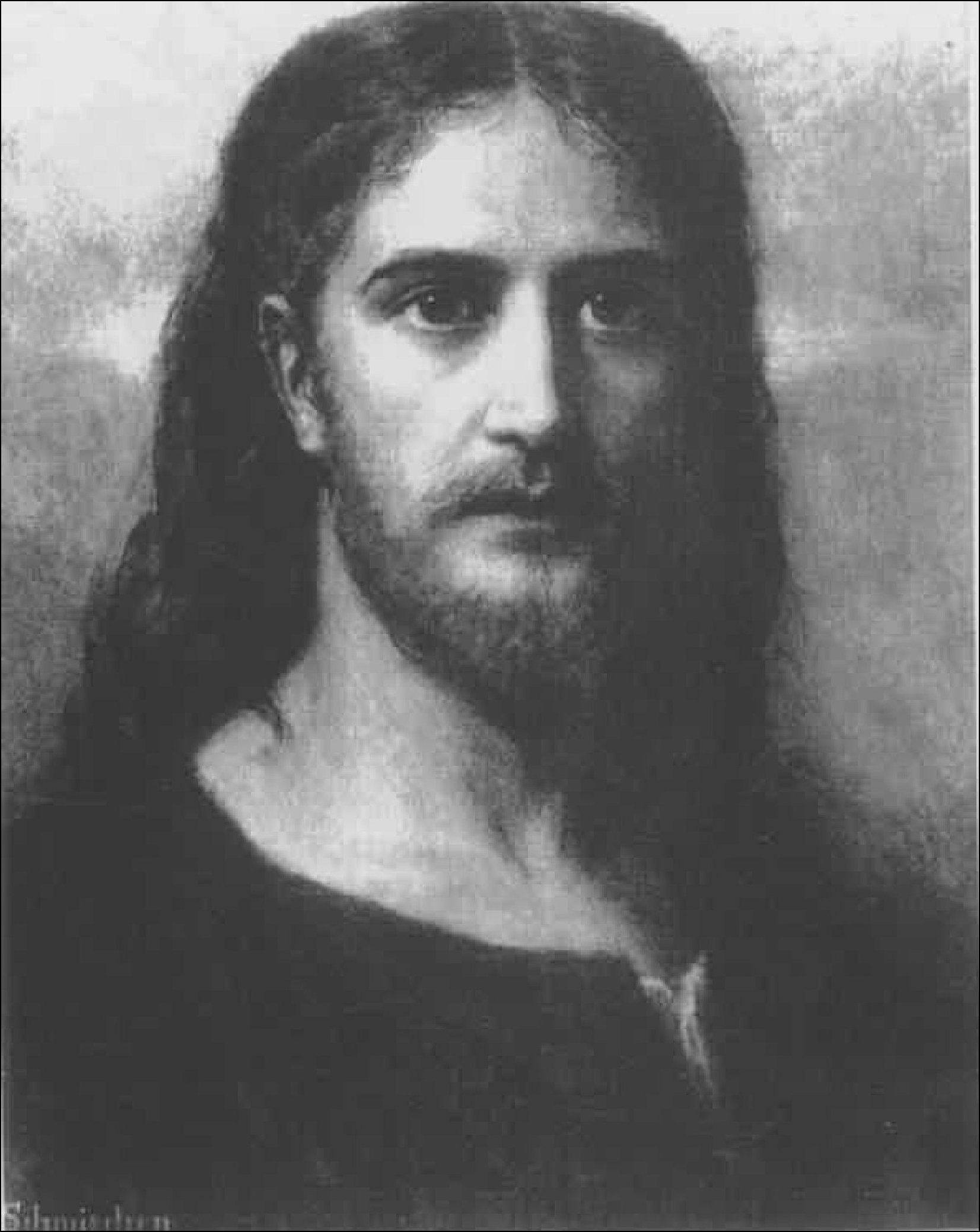
Portrait of Jesus.

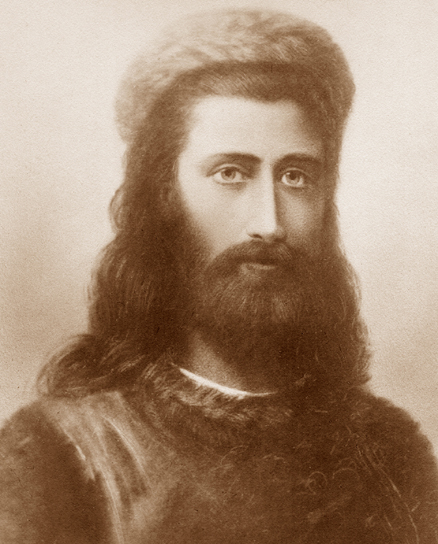
Portrait of Kuthumi.
- Bildnis einer Dame (Note: Ident.Nr. A II 450. "Das undatierte, höchstwahrscheinlich private Bildnis einer jungen Frau, rückseitig 'Irmgard' beschriftet, dürfte noch aus der Düsseldorfer Zeit stammen.") (in German)
- Opernsängerin Lillian Nordica, 1878 (in German)
- Princess Victoria of Hesse (Note: Royal Collection, Cat. No. 624.)
- Princess Elizabeth of Hesse (Note: Royal Collection, Cat. No. 625.)
- Princess Mary Adelaide, Duchess of Teck, 1882 (Note: Royal Collection, Cat. No. 626.)
- Princess Frederica of Hanover, Baroness von Pawel-Rammingen, 1884 (Note: Royal Collection, Cat. No. 627.)
- Turtelndes Liebespaar am Fenster, 1895 (in German)
- Dame mit Rosenkorb, 1895 (in German)

== See also ==
- Agni Yoga
- Theosophists as artists
- Theosophy (Blavatskian)
