= Blue Annals =

1476 Tibetan religious survey

The Blue Annals (Tibetan: དེབ་ཐེར་སྔོན་པོ, Wylie: deb ther sngon po), completed in 1476, written by Gö Lotsawa Zhönnu-pel (Wylie: gos lo tsā ba gzhon nu dpal, 1392–1481), is a Tibetan historical survey with a marked ecumenical (Rimé movement) view, focusing on the dissemination of various sectarian religious traditions throughout Tibet.

An English translation by George de Roerich with help from Gendün Chöphel was published in 1949 and has since remained one of the most widely consulted sources on the history of Tibetan Buddhism up to the fifteenth century.

The Tibetan and Himalayan Library is working on a new online translation of the Blue Annals.

A similar work from a later period is Tuken Lozang Chö kyi Nyima's Crystal Mirror of Philosophical Systems (Wylie: grub mtha' shel gyi me long) completed in 1802. Tuken favored the Gelug school, but he nonetheless provides broad and useful historical information, relying heavily on the Blue Annals himself.

== Editions ==
The following modern editions are in print:

- Chandra, Lokesh (Ed. & Translator) (1974). The Blue Annals. International Academy of Indian Culture, New Delhi. This edition is a reproduction from block prints kept at Kundeling Monastery, Lhasa. The colophon (Chandra 970; Chengdu 1271; Roerich 1093) was composed by Rta tshag 8 Ye shes blo bzang bstan pa’i mgon po (1760–1810).
- Chengdu (Wylie: si khron mi rigs dpe skrun khang) (1984). deb ther sngon po. Two volumes, paginated continuously. According to Martin (1997), this modern edition is based upon the Kundeling Monastery blockprint and collated with the edition of Dga’ ldan chos ‘khor gling (Ganden Monastery), Amdo.
- Roerich, George N. and Gendün Chöphel, translator (1988). The Blue Annals by Gö Lotsawa. Motilal Banarsidass, Delhi, 1976, Reprint in 1979. [reprint of Calcutta, Royal Asiatic Society of Bengal, 1949, in two volumes].

== Etymology ==
The term Blue Annals (Chinese: 青史) or Bamboo History was a word found in the Tang dynasty poem by Du Fu (722–770) 唐·杜甫《赠郑十八贲》诗：“古人日以远，青史自不泯。” translating as, "The ancients' times are long gone, but their names carved on bamboo remain fresh." The word is also found in the famous Chinese novel Romance of the Three Kingdoms, a work that is estimated to have been completed in 1367. The original sentence reads 《三国演义．第三十六回》：「愿诸公善事使君，以图名垂竹帛，功标青史。」An excerpt from the thirty-sixth chapter of Three Kingdoms, this translates as, "May all your public and good deeds make your lordship hang down bamboo and silk with your name, and your achievements make their mark on history."
