= George de Roerich =

Russian Tibetologist (1902–1960)

- Юрий Рёрих
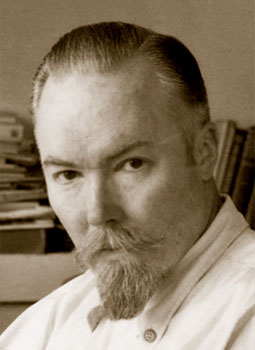
- George de Roerich in 1938
- Pronunciation: IPA: [ˈjʉrʲɪj nʲɪkəˈlajɪvʲɪtɕ ˈrʲɵrʲɪx]
- Born: George Nicolas de Roerich; August 16, 1902; Okulovka, Russia
- Died: May 21, 1960 (aged 57); Moscow, Soviet Union
- Resting place: Novodevichy Cemetery
- Occupations: Tibetologist; translator
- Parents: Nicholas Roerich (father); Helena Roerich (mother)
- Relatives: Svetoslav Roerich (brother); Devika Rani (sister-in-law)

Academic background
- Education: School of Oriental Studies, University of London, 1918–1920; Harvard University, 1920–1922; University of Paris, 1922–1923

George Nicolas de Roerich (Russian: Юрий Николаевич Рёрих, romanized: Yury Nikolayevich Ryorikh, (Note: Variant spellings of Yuri: Yury, Yuriy, or Iurii. The name "George" is a commonly used English equivalent of the Russian name "Yuri". Another variant of his name is spelled thus: Ūrij Nikolaevič Rerih. His surname is also transliterated as Rerikh.) IPA: [ˈjʉrʲɪj nʲɪkəˈlajɪvʲɪtɕ ˈrʲɵrʲɪx]; 1902–1960) was a Russian Tibetologist and translator. Roerich's work encompassed many areas of Tibetan studies, but he is most known for his contributions to Tibetan dialectology, his translation of the Blue Annals, and his 11-volume Tibetan–Russian–English dictionary (published posthumously).

== Early life ==
George was the son of the painter and explorer Nicholas Roerich and Helena Roerich. Much of Roerich's early life was spent in Saint Petersburg. His brother, Svetoslav Roerich, was born in 1904. Both sons' interests were nurtured by their mother, who wrote of her oldest son's childhood: "The elder one showed love for history and tin soldiers. He had thousands of them. His passion for the art of war has survived until now. Strategy is his pet subject. By the way, this talent is inborn, and he is very proud of his ancestor — field marshal of the Russian Empire Mikhail Kutuzov, the hero of Patriotic War of 1812."

== Education ==
By the time Roerich was 15, he had begun studying Egyptology with Boris Turayev and Mongolian language and history with Andrei Dmitriyevich Rudnyev. He was a student with broad interests and many talents. After finishing his studies at Karl May School, he entered the Indian and Iranian Department of Oriental Languages at London University in 1918. Under Indologist Professor Edward Denison Ross he studied Sanskrit and Pali. He was recognized for his language abilities and was introduced as the best Sanskrit student to the Secretary of State for Indian Affairs who visited the university.

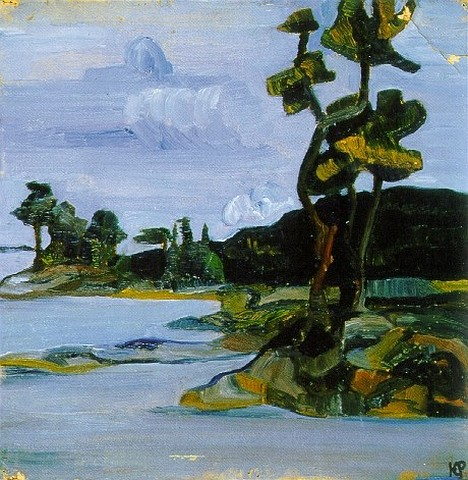
Pines on Shore by George de Roerich, 1921

Upon completion of his study at London University in 1920, he moved to America with his parents. He studied in the Indian Philology Department of Harvard University. At the age of 18, Roerich was already firmly rooted in his passion for Oriental studies. He mastered Sanskrit during his time at Harvard under the direction of Professor Charles Rockwell Lanman, whose comparative grammar lessons made a lifelong impact on George's future studies. Roerich also attended lectures by Professor Michael Rostovtzeff on Middle Asia influences in the art of southern Russia. During his years at Harvard, he studied Buddhism classical Chinese. He received both a bachelor's and master's degree from Harvard University, then continued his education in Paris, France.

He spent the years 1922–1923 at Paris University in Sorbonne, working in the Department of Middle Asian, Indian and Mongol-Tibetan Studies and studying in the Military Department as well as the Department of Law and Economy. During his time there, he worked with orientalists as Paul Pelliot and Sylvain Lévi. He learned Mongolian and Tibetan while also continuing his study of Chinese and Persian languages. He graduated with his M.A. in Indian Philology in 1923.

== Career ==
=== Early work ===
Roerich began his independent research at the age of 21. In November 1923, he left for Bombay with his family. After years of study and preparation, his dream of going to India came true. By December 1923, he had arrived at the base of the Himalayas as a member of a scientific expedition to Sikkim. The purpose of this expedition was to visit ancient monuments and Buddhist monasteries as well as to record local legends, beliefs, and artistic traditions. In Darjeeling, George polished his colloquial Tibetan with scholar Lama L.M. Dorje, who guided him in the study of Tibetan Art. Roerich found strong similarities between ancient Russian icon painting and the art of thangka painting in both technique and in the treatment of the subject. He wrote: "Indeed, it seems that the Russian icon art and the Tibetan pictorial art derive their methods of work from a common source...Thus we often see on Tibetan paintings the principal figures enthroned on an island (this being usually the case when Buddha or Bodhisattva is represented). Similar images are frequently found on Russian icons." In 1925, Roerich published his first book titled Tibetan Paintings in which he attempted to define Tibetan art, its history, and the three existing schools of art in Tibet. David Jackson in his A History of Tibetan Painting acknowledged that in the Western scholarship, "the earliest account of Tibetan paintings styles...was that of George Roerich".

=== Central Asian expedition ===
In 1925, Roerich family embarked on a 4-year journey through Central Asia, starting in India. It was a crucial time in George Roerich's career as a scientist, and he began his study of ancient pre-Buddhist doctrine of Bon and the translation of its manuscript. Despite the difficulties of travel and political instability, Roerich managed to make several important discoveries during this expedition, including previously unknown materials about the Tibetan Epic of King Gesar. He also found that Northern Tibetan also used the animal style that was used by nomads who had migrated from Central Asia to South Russia in the 7th and 8th centuries B.C.E. Roerich believed that "All art objects made in animal style found and described by the expedition clearly proved the existence of ancient Central Asian art amongst nomads of Tibet."

His role as translator was invaluable to the group as they traveled. Roerich could speak Mongolian and Tibetan fluently as well as many other Central Asian languages. Despite his young age, he was given the task of guarding the group's safety. Here, his knowledge of military tactics from his university study proved useful and his tactical skills and courage saved their caravan on more than one occasion. His study of the geography, archeology, ethnology, and linguistics during the expedition formed the basis of his work Trails to Inmost Asia, published in 1930. This publication put the young orientalist on par with the famous researchers of Central Asia, such as Nikolay Przhevalsky, Grigory Potanin, Pyotr Kozlov, and Sven Hedin.

Of this journey, Roerich later said: "The expedition headed by Professor Nicholas Roerich, organized by the Roerich Museum in New York and International Centre of Art 'Corona Mundi' had as its main task creation of the unique pictorial panorama of the lands and nations of Inmost Asia.

"The second task, was research of the possibilities of the new archaeological excavations, and thus, preparation of the ways for the future expeditions in this region. The third task was research of the languages and dialects of Central Asia, and gathering a big collection of objects, that depict spiritual culture of these nations. Central Asia has been a cradle and a meeting place of many Asian civilizations, and inaccessible mountain valleys till our days preserved many invaluable linguistic and ethnographic materials, which can help to reconstruct the past of Asia."

=== Himalayan Research Institute ===
The plethora of materials collected during the Central Asia Expedition became the foundation for the establishment of the Himalayan Research Institute named Urusvati in Darjeeling in 1928. A few months later, the institute moved to Naggar in Kulu Valley. The center engaged in scientific exchange with 285 institutes, universities, museums, and libraries around the world. Roerich collaborated with Tibetan scholars and published the Tibetan English Dictionary in 1934. One of his main focuses for the center was to bring people to the institute who practiced and lived the cultures being examined by the center. He was the director of the institute for 10 years.

=== Manchuria expedition ===
In 1934–1935, the U.S. Department of Agriculture organized an expedition for Roerich and his father Nicholas Roerich to Manchuria and Inner Mongolia for the purpose of collecting the seeds of drought resistant plants, with the hopes that they that would help prevent erosion of soils and the spreading of pests. This expedition was also to create wider agricultural cooperation and public collaboration. Nicholas led the expedition, and George Roerich was the assistant and responsible for the medicinal research. They gathered a collection of drought resistant plants, herbs, and soil as well as a list of traditional medicinal treatments. Roerich made maps and conducted a photo survey of the region in which the expedition took place. In 1935, the research from the expedition was transferred back to India, and the Roerichs returned to Kulu Valley in October 1935.

== Later life ==
After the Manchuria expedition, Roerich spent many years living in India. His father Nicholas Roerich died in 1947. Due to political unrest in the area, Roerich moved with his mother Helena Roerich from their home in Nagger to Kalimpong where he lived until 1956. Helena Roerich died in 1955, and in 1957, Roerich returned to Russia. Before his return to his homeland, Roerich participated in several important projects.

He collaborated with Prince Peter of Greece and Denmark and R. Sanskrtyayana to translate the Buddhist text Pramanavaartikam from Tibetan into Sanskrit. Working with Tse-Trung Lopsang Phuntshok he wrote Textbook of Colloquial Tibetan. Together with Gendün Chöphel, he translated Blue Annals, the lengthy pioneering work on Tibetan history, published in two volumes by the Asiatic Society in 1949 and 1954. After spending almost 30 years in India, Roerich returned in 1957 to Soviet Russia, where he made efforts to revive the Russian School of Oriental Studies. As the head of the Indology Department in the Institute of Oriental Studies in Moscow, he resumed editing of Bibliotheca Buddhica. This was a series devoted to the publication of Buddhist texts and monographs on the subject, started in 1897 by Prof. S.F. Oldenburg. In this same series A.I. Vostrikov's Tibetan Historical Literature and Dhammapada were translated from Pali.

His return to Russia and acquisition of Soviet citizenship was courageous as the USSR's opinion of his family was rather distorted. Because of his effort, bans were lifted on everything associated with the Roerich family name, and the legacy of research left by the family was preserved. The first of his father's exhibitions was organized in Moscow in 1958, then spread to Leningrad, Riga, Kiev, Tbilisi, and other cities. He was able to dispel myths about the family's philosophy of Agni Yoga and start a cultural movement using this philosophy to spread Living Ethics in the USSR.

Roerich died on May 21, 1960, at the age of 58, and his ashes were placed in Moscow at the Novodevichy Cemetery. Svetoslav Roerich wrote his memorial.

== Works ==
- de Roerich, George (1925). Tibetan Paintings. Paris: Paul Geuthner.
- de Roerich, George (1930). The Animal Style Among the Nomads of Northern Tibet. Prague: Seminarium Kondakovianum.
- de Roerich, George (1931). Trails to Inmost Asia. Yale University Press.
- de Roerich, George (1931). “Modern Tibetan Phonetics: With special reference to the Dialect of Central Tibet.” Journal and Proceedings of the Asiatic Society of Bengal 27.1: 285-312.
- de Roerich, George (1932). Review of Jäschke 1881. Journal of Urusvati 2: 165-169.
- de Roerich, George (1933). Dialects of Tibet: The Tibetan Dialect of Lahul. (Tibetica 1) New York: Urusvati Himalayan Research Institute of Roerich Museum.
- de Roerich, George (1958). Le Parler de l’Amdo: Étude d’un Dialecte Archaïque du Tibet. (Serie Orientale Roma 18). Rome: Istituto Italiano per il Medio ed Estremo Oriente.
- de Roerich, George Nicolas ( 11 vols., 1983–1993 ). Tibetsko-russko-angliiskii slovar: s sanskritskimi paralleliami. Tibetan-Russian-English dictionary with Sanskrit parallels. Y. Parfionovich and V. Dylykova, eds. Moscow: Izd-vo "Nauka," Glav. red. vostochnoi lit-ry / Central Department of Oriental Literature.
- de Roerich, George N. and Tse-Trung Lopsang Phuntshok (1957). Textbook of colloquial Tibetian: dialect of central Tibet. Calcutta: Govt. of West Bengal, Education Dept., Education Bureau.
- Roerich, George N. and Gedun Choepel (Translator) (1988). The Blue Annals by Gö Lotsawa. Motilal Banarsidass, Delhi, 1976, Reprint in 1979. [reprint of Calcutta, Royal Asiatic Society of Bengal, 1949, in two volumes].

== See also ==
- 4426 Roerich — minor planet
- Roerichism
- Helena Roerich
- Nicholas Roerich
- Svetoslav Roerich

== Sources ==
- Andreyev, Alexandre (May 8, 2014). The Myth of the Masters Revived: The Occult Lives of Nikolai and Elena Roerich. BRILL. ISBN 978-90-04-27043-5.
- Kravchenko, Natalia R. and Vladimir Zaitsev. 2003. Professor George de Roerich and His Outstanding Contribution to Indo-Asian Studies
- George (Yuri) Nikolaievich Roerich.
- Yuri Nikolayevich Roerich. International Center of the Roerichs.
- "George Roerich /Yuri Nikolayevich Roerich/ (1902 – 1960)". irmtkullu.com.
