= List of rural localities in Smolensk Oblast =

Map of Russia with Smolensk Oblast highlighted

This is an incomplete list of rural localities in Smolensk Oblast. Smolensk Oblast, (Russian: Смоле́нская о́бласть, Smolenskaya oblast), known informally as Smolenschina (Russian: Смоле́нщина) is a federal subject of Russia (an oblast). Its administrative center is the city of Smolensk. As of the 2010 Census, its population was 985,537.

== Locations ==
- Agaponovough
- Bibishki
- Glinka — selo, administrative center of Glinkovsky District
- Gnyozdovo
- Gusino
- Kadino
- Katyn
- Klushino
- Krasatinka
- Lyubavichi
- Novodugino — selo, administrative center of Novoduginsky District
- Ostyor
- Pechersk
- Petrovichi
- Ray
- Sneberka
- Talashkino
- Tsaryovo-Zaymishche
- Tyomkino
- Vorga
- Yershichi — selo, administrative center of Yershichsky District

== See also ==
- Lists of rural localities in Russia
