= Krasatinka =

Krasatinka (Russian: Красатинка) is the name of several rural localities in Smolensk Oblast, Russia:

- Krasatinka, Krasninsky District, Smolensk Oblast, a village in Oktyabrskoye Rural Settlement of Krasninsky District
- Krasatinka, Monastyrshchinsky District, Smolensk Oblast, a village in Tatarskoye Rural Settlement of Monastyrshchinsky District
