= Vladimir Karpovich Dmitriev =

Vladimir Karpovich Dmitriev (Russian: Влади́мир Ка́рпович Дми́триев; November 24, 1868, Ray, Smolensky Uyezd, Smolensk Governorate – September 30, 1913, Gatchina) was a Russian mathematical economist and statistician. Dmitriev was born in Smolensk and completed his studies in Moscow.

He was one of the early developers of Input-Output analysis, by proposing mathematical methods to determine of full labour costs. His ideas were revived by V. S. Nemchinov in 1959. He was an important influence on Alexander Chayanov who in 1926 adapted his methods for use in agricultural context.

== Major works ==
- Economic Essays on Value, Competition and Utility, 1898-1902. ISBN 0-521-20253-1

I.The Theory of Value of David Ricardo: An attempt at a rigorous analysis (1898),
II. The Theory of Competition of Augustin Cournot (1902),
III. The Theory of Marginal Utility (1902)

translation introduced by Domenico Mario Nuti, Cambridge: Cambridge University Press, 1974
