= Kadino =

Kadino (Russian: Кадино, Belarusian: Кадзіна) is the name of several rural localities in Russia and Belarus:

== Belarus ==
- Kadino, Mogilev district, a village in Kadzinski Rural Council of Mogilev district in Mogilev region
- Kadino, Chavusy district, a village in Gorbovichski Rural Council of Chavusy district in Mogilev region

== Russia ==
- Kadino, Smolensk Oblast, a village in Tatarskoye Rural Settlement of Monastyrshchinsky District in Smolensk Oblast
- Kadino, Tver Oblast, a village in Mednovskoye Rural Settlement of Kalininsky District in Tver Oblast
- Kadino, Yaroslavl Oblast, a village in Varegovsky Rural Okrug of Bolsheselsky District in Yaroslavl Oblast
