= Nicholas Roerich =

Russian painter, writer, archaeologist and philosopher (1874–1947)

- Николай Рерих
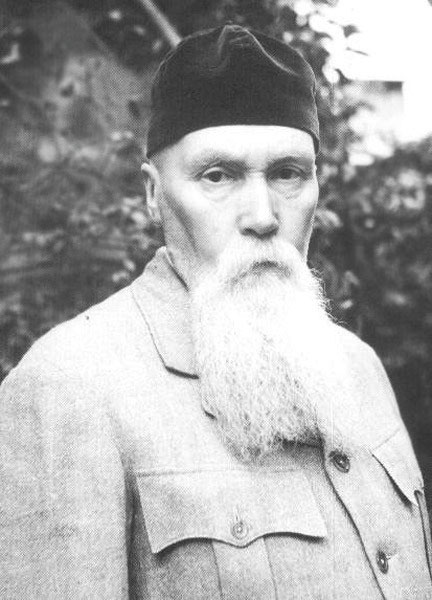
- Roerich c. 1940–1947
- Born: October 9, 1874; Saint Petersburg, Russia
- Died: December 13, 1947 (aged 73); Naggar, India
- Occupations: Painter; archaeologist; costume and set designer for ballets, operas, and dramas
- Spouse: Helena Roerich
- Children: George de Roerich, Svetoslav Roerich

Nikolai Konstantinovich Rerikh (Note: Also spelled as Ryorikh, from Russian: Рёрих) (Russian: Николай Константинович Рерих), better known as Nicholas Roerich (/ˈrɛrɪk/; October 9, 1874 – December 13, 1947), was a Russian painter, writer, archaeologist, theosophist, philosopher, and public figure. He is best known for his prolific body of artwork, which spans over 7,000 paintings, and his contributions to a wide array of cultural, political, intellectual, and artistic movements and causes. The Government of India has recognized him as a Navaratna, one of India's nine great artists whose work is protected as a national treasure.

Born in Saint Petersburg to a Baltic German father and Russian mother, Roerich had a privileged upbringing that exposed him to many artists, intellectuals, and scientists. In his youth he displayed a natural curiosity and aptitude for various activities and subjects ranging from drawing to botany. Trained as an artist and lawyer, his main interests were literature, philosophy, archaeology, spiritual practice, and esotericism. An avid music enthusiast, he also found success in set design, most notably for Sergei Diaghilev's Ballets Russes and for the 1913 premiere of Igor Stravinsky’s early Modernist ballet The Rite of Spring.

Roerich was deeply influenced by Russian Symbolism—which promoted mysticism, free expression, and the transformative power of art—and Russian Cosmism, which sought to integrate science, religion, and metaphysics into a unified worldview. Drawing inspiration from prehistoric, Russian, Central Asian, and Eastern civilizations, his paintings focus on grand natural landscapes—particularly the Himalayas—symbolic imagery, and mythical and religious themes. Roerich's artwork has been noted for its ethereal and transcendental qualities, which reflect his belief that art could serve as a vehicle for spirituality, personal transformation, and global harmony.

Roerich lived in various places until his death in Naggar, India. He organized and participated in expeditions across Central and East Asia and founded more than a dozen cultural and educational institutions and societies worldwide. Motivated by the idea of "Peace through Culture", Roerich advocated for the universal preservation of art and architecture; he launched and led the Banner of Peace movement that culminated in the so-called Roerich Pact for the protection of cultural objects, which was ratified by the United States and most other nations of the Pan-American Union in April 1935. For these efforts he was nominated several times for the Nobel Peace Prize.

With his wife Helena (née Shaposhnikova), Roerich established the neo-theosophical doctrine of Agni Yoga, which combines elements of Western and Eastern thought, religion, and philosophy. Also known as "the Living Ethics", this body of teachings—along with Roerich's spiritual and philosophical works and ideas—forms the basis of a spiritual, cultural and social movement known as Roerichism.

== Biography ==
=== Early life ===
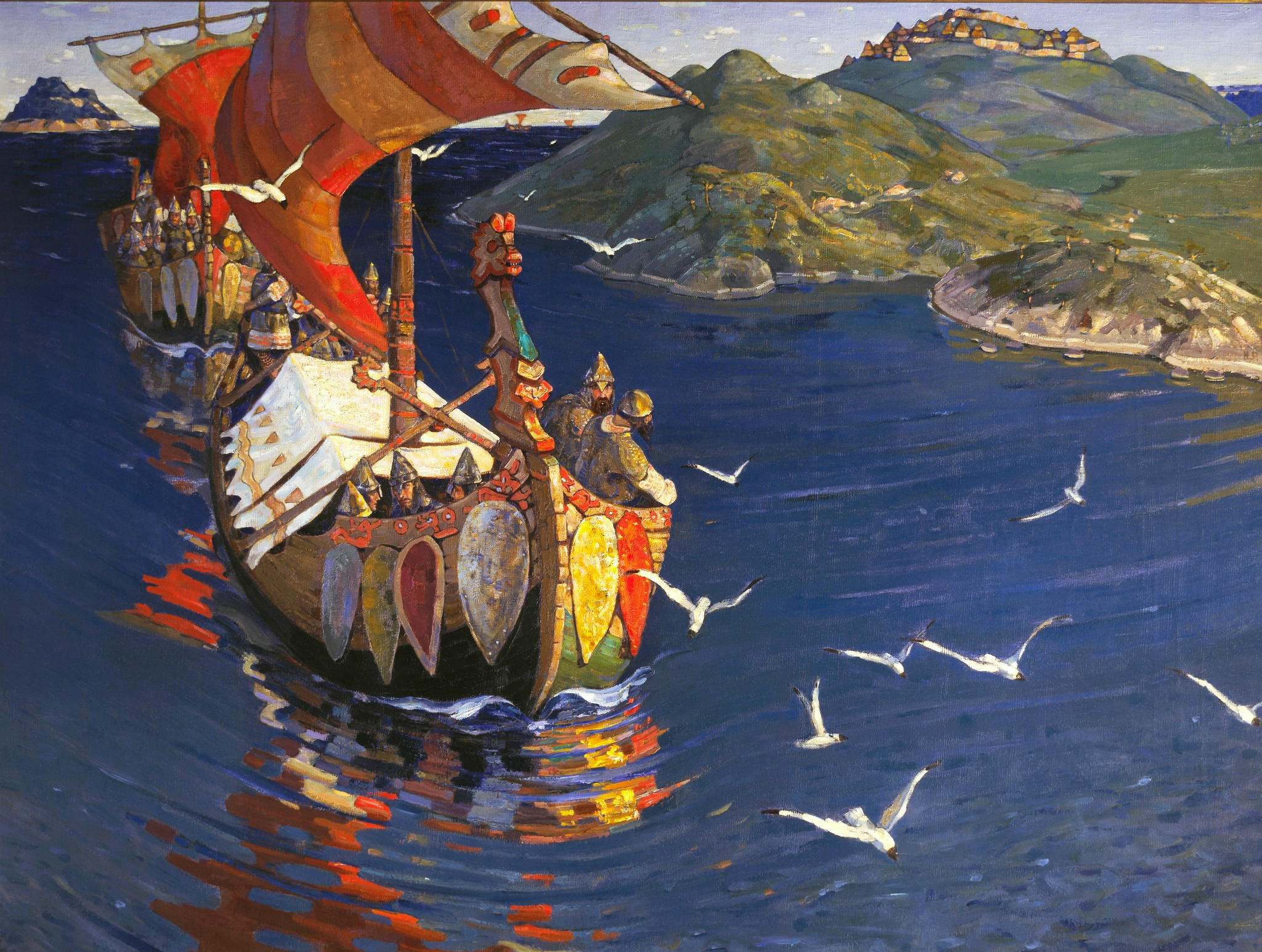
Guests from Overseas, 1901 (Varangians in Rus')

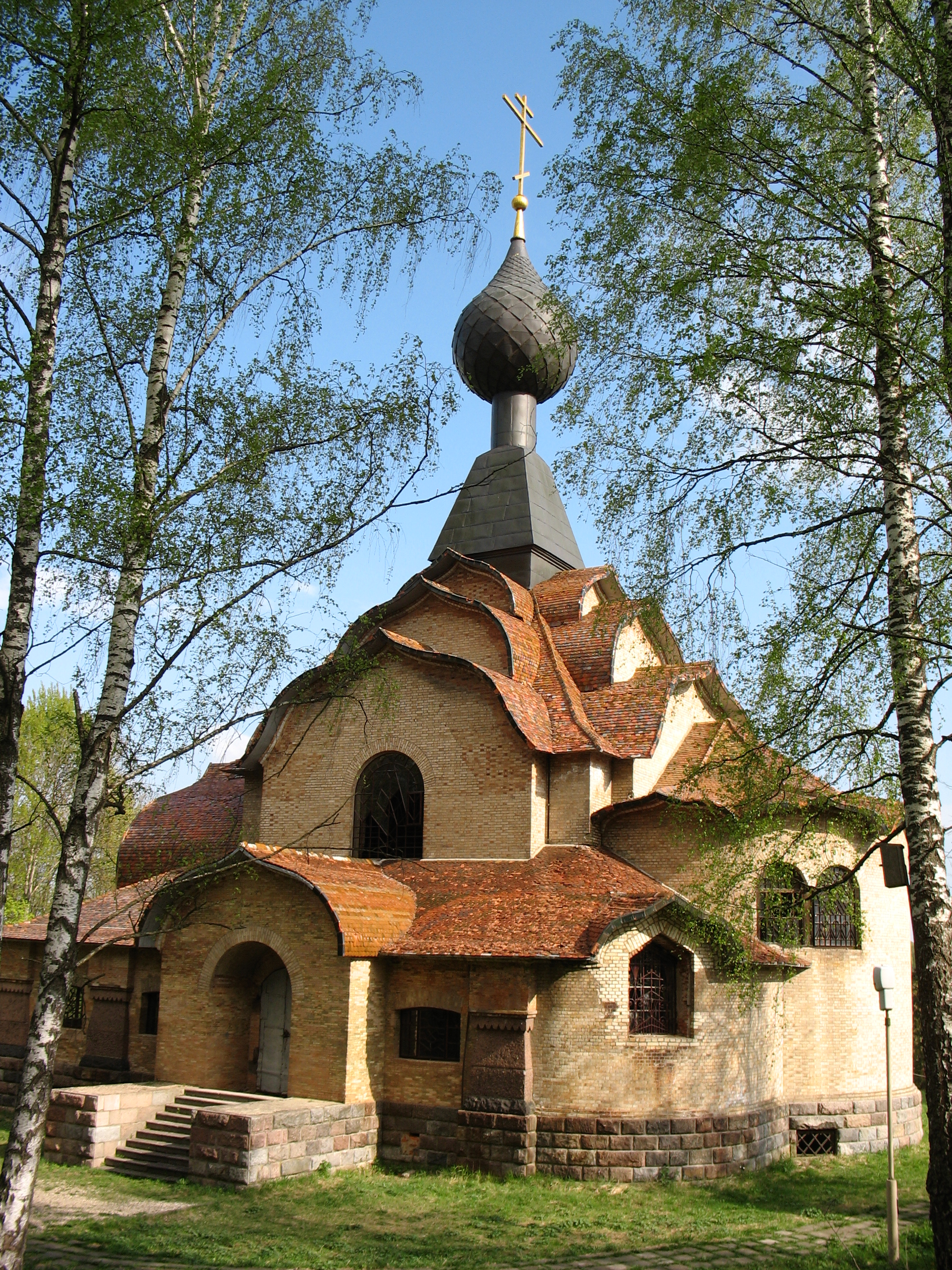
Church of the Holy Spirit in Talashkino

Raised in late-19th-century St. Petersburg, Roerich enrolled simultaneously at St. Petersburg University and the Imperial Academy of Arts in 1893. He received the title of "artist" in 1897 and a degree in law the next year. He stayed in Florence in 1906, and found early employment with the Imperial Society for the Encouragement of the Arts, whose school he directed from this year to 1917. Despite early tensions with the group, he became a member of Sergei Diaghilev's "World of Art" society and was its president from 1910 to 1916.

Artistically, Roerich became known as his generation's most talented painter of Russia's ancient past, a topic that was compatible with his lifelong interest in archeology. He also succeeded as a stage designer by achieving his greatest fame as one of the designers for Diaghilev's Ballets Russes. His best-known designs were for Alexander Borodin's Prince Igor (1909 and later productions), and costumes and set for The Rite of Spring (1913), composed by Igor Stravinsky.

Along with Mikhail Vrubel and Mikhail Nesterov, Roerich is considered a major representative of Russian Symbolism in art. From an early period of his life, he was influenced by apocrypha and medieval sectarian writings such as the mysterious Dove Book.

Another of Roerich's artistic subjects was architecture. His acclaimed publication "Architectural Studies" (1904–1905), consisting of dozens of paintings he made of fortresses, monasteries, churches, and other monuments during two long trips through Russia, inspired his decades-long career as an activist on behalf of artistic and architectural preservation. He also designed religious art for places of worship throughout Russia and Ukraine, most notably the Queen of Heaven fresco for the Church of the Holy Spirit, which the patroness Maria Tenisheva built near her Talashkino estate, and the stained glass windows for the Datsan Gunzechoinei in 1913–1915. His designs for the Talashkino church were so radical that the Orthodox church refused to consecrate the building.

During the first decade of the 1900s and in the early 1910s, Roerich, largely by the influence of his wife, Helena, developed an interest in eastern religions, as well as alternative belief systems such as Theosophy. Both Roerichs became avid readers of the Vedantist essays of Ramakrishna and Vivekananda, the poetry of Rabindranath Tagore, and the Bhagavad Gita.

The Roerichs' commitment to occult mysticism increased steadily. It was especially intense during World War I and the 1917 Russian Revolution to which the couple, like other many Russian intellectuals, accorded apocalyptic significance. The influence of Theosophy, Vedanta, Buddhism, and other mystical topics can be detected not only in many of Roerich's paintings but also in the many short stories and poems that Roerich wrote before and after the 1917 revolutions, including the Flowers of Morya cycle, which was begun in 1907 and completed in 1921.

=== Revolution and emigration to United States ===
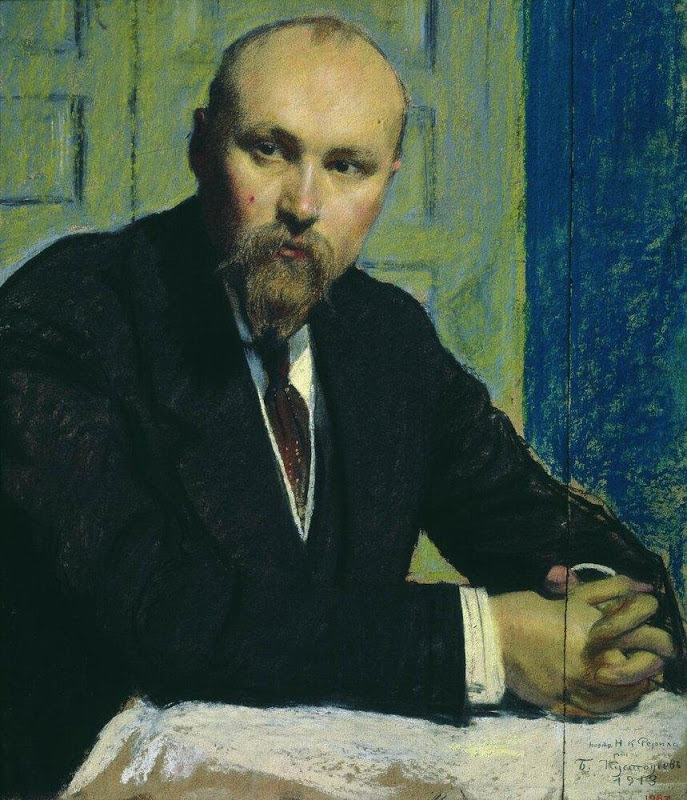
Nicholas Roerich by Kustodiev. 1913

After the February Revolution of 1917 and the end of the czarist regime, Roerich, a political moderate who valued Russia's cultural heritage more than ideology and party politics, had an active part in artistic politics. With Maxim Gorky and Aleksandr Benois, he participated with the so-called "Gorky Commission" and its successor organization, the Arts Union (SDI). Both attempted to gain the attention of the Provisional Government and Petrograd Soviet on the need to form a coherent cultural policy and, most urgently, to protect art and architecture from destruction and vandalism.

Meanwhile, illness forced Roerich to leave the capital and reside in Karelia, the district bordering Finland. He had already quit the presidency of the World of Art society, and he now quit the directorship of the School of the Imperial Society for the Encouragement of the Arts. After the October Revolution put Lenin and the Bolsheviks in power, Roerich became increasingly discouraged about Russia's political future. During early 1918, he, Helena, and their two sons George and Svetoslav emigrated to Finland.

Two unresolved historical debates are associated with Roerich's departure. First, it is often claimed that Roerich was a major candidate to direct a "People's Commissariat of Culture ", which the Bolsheviks considered establishing in 1917–1918, but he refused to accept the job. In fact, Benois was the most likely choice to direct any such commissariat. It seems that Roerich was a preferred choice to manage its department of artistic education; the topic is rendered moot by the fact that the Soviets elected not to establish such a commissariat.

Second, when Roerich later wished to reconcile with the Soviet Union, he maintained that he had not left Soviet Russia deliberately, but that he and his family, living in Karelia, had been isolated from their homeland when the Finnish Civil War began. However, Roerich had an amply-documented extreme hostility to the Bolshevik regime, prompted not so much by a dislike of Communism as by his revulsion at Lenin's ruthlessness and his fear that Bolshevism would result in the destruction of Russia's artistic and architectural heritage. He illustrated Leonid Andreyev's anti-Communist polemic "S.O.S." and had a widely-published pamphlet, "Violators of Art" (1918–1919). Roerich believed that "the triumph of Russian culture would come about through a new appreciation of ancient myth and legend."

After some months in Finland and Scandinavia, the Roerichs relocated to London, arriving in mid-1919. Engrossed with Theosophical mysticism, they now had millenarian expectations that a new age was imminent, and they wished to travel to India as soon as possible. They joined the English-Welsh chapter of the Theosophical Society. It was in London, in March 1920, that the Roerichs founded their own school of mysticism, Agni Yoga, which they described as "the system of living ethics." While in London, Roerich also contributed scenic designs for LAHDA, a cooperative group of Russian theatrical artists led by Theodore Komisarjevsky.

To earn passage to India, Roerich worked as a stage designer for Thomas Beecham's Covent Garden Theatre, but the enterprise ended unsuccessfully in 1920, and the artist never received full payment for his work. Among the notable people Roerich befriended while in England were the famed British Buddhist Christmas Humphreys, the philosopher-author H. G. Wells, and the poet and Nobel laureate Rabindranath Tagore (whose grand-niece Devika Rani would later marry Roerich's son Svetoslav).

A successful exhibition in London resulted in an invitation from a director at the Art Institute of Chicago, offering to arrange for Roerich's art to tour the United States. In the autumn of 1920, the Roerichs traveled to America by sea.

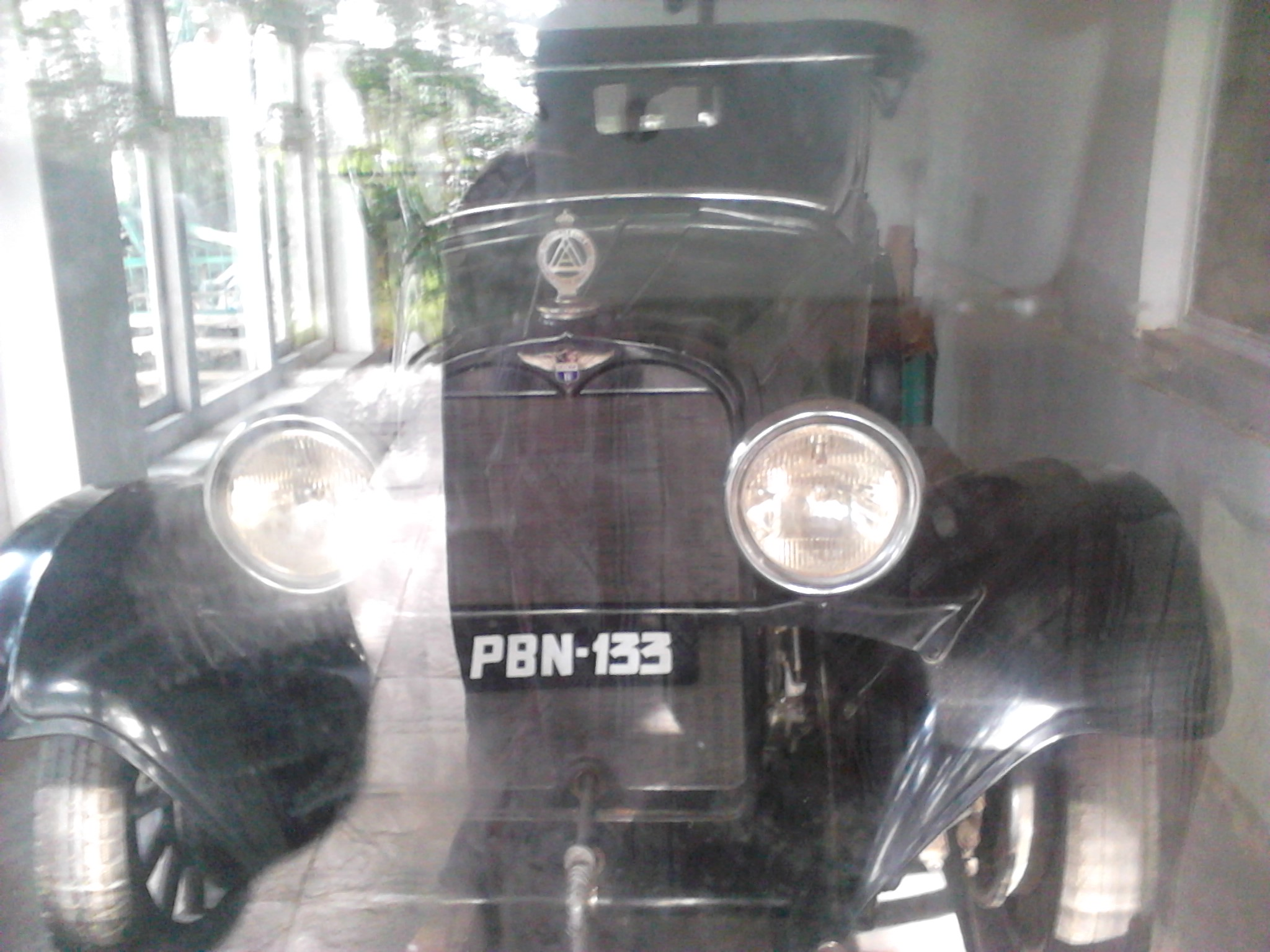
Car of Nicolas Roerich in his museum at Naggar

The Roerichs remained in the United States from October 1920 until May 1923. A large exhibition of Roerich's art, organized partly by the U.S. impresario Christian Brinton and partly by the Art Institute, began in New York in December 1920 and toured the country, to San Francisco and back, in 1921 and early 1922. Roerich befriended acclaimed soprano Mary Garden, "directa" of the Chicago Civic Opera and received a commission to design a 1922 production of Rimsky-Korsakov's The Snow Maiden for her. During the exhibition, the Roerichs spent significant amounts of time in Chicago, New Mexico, and California.

Politically, Roerich was at first anti-Bolshevik. He gave lectures and wrote articles to White Russian populations in which he criticized the Soviet Union. However, his aversion to Communism, "the impertinent monster that lies to humanity," changed in America.

Roerich claimed that his spiritual masters, the "Mahatmas" in the Himalayas, were communicating telepathically with him through his wife, Helena, who was a mystic and a clairvoyant. The beings from an esoteric Buddhist community in India were said to have told Roerich that Russia was destined for a mission on Earth. That led him to formulate his "Great Plan," which envisaged the unification of millions of Asian peoples through a religious movement using the Future Buddha, or Maitreya, into a "Second Union of the East." There, the King of Shambhala would, following the Maitreya prophecies, make his appearance to fight a great battle against all evil forces on Earth. Roerich understood that as "perfection towards Common Good." The new polity was to include southwestern Altai, Tuva, Buryatia, Outer and Inner Mongolia, Xinjiang and Tibet, with its capital in "Zvenigorod," the "City of Tolling Bells," which was to be built at the foot of Mount Belukha, in Altai. According to Roerich, the same Mahatmas revealed to him in 1922 that he was an incarnation of the Fifth Dalai Lama.

Roerich's collaboration with Bolshevik diplomats and aim to gather intelligence on the British, led several scholars to place Nicholas Roerich as a participant in the British-Russian colonial Great Game.

In 1923, Roerich, the "practical idealist," set out to the Himalayas with his wife and his son Yuri. Roerich initially settled in Darjeeling in the same house that the 13th Dalai Lama had stayed during his exile in India. Roerich spent his time painting the Himalayas with visitors such as Frederick Marshman Bailey, Lady Emily Bulwer-Lytton, and members of the 1924 British Everest Expedition, as well as Sonam Wangfel Laden La, Kusho Doring, and Tsarong Shape, influential Tibetans. According to British intelligence, lamas from the Moru monastery recognized Roerich as the incarnation of the Fifth Dalai Lama due to a mole pattern on his right cheek. It was during his stay in the Himalayas that Roerich learned about the flight of the 9th Panchen Lama, which he interpreted as the fulfillment of the Matreiya prophecies and the bringing about of the Age of Shambhala.

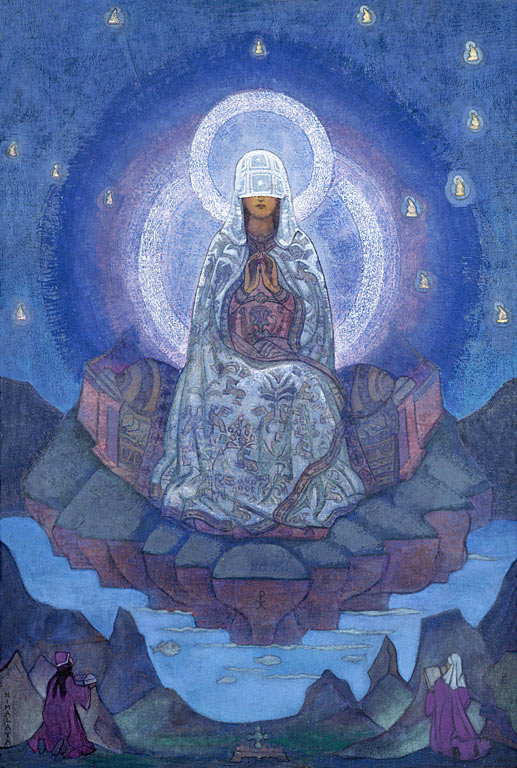
Mother of the World (1924); most likely a depiction of the Theotokos or Sophia

In 1924, the Roerichs returned to the West. On his way to America, Roerich stopped at the Soviet embassy in Berlin, where he told the local plenipotentiary about a Central Asian expedition he wanted to take. He asked for Soviet protection on his way, and shared his impressions of politics in India and Tibet. Roerich commented on the "occupation of Tibet by the British" by claiming that they "infiltrate in small parties... conduct extensive anti-Soviet propaganda" by talking about "anti-religious activity of the Bolsheviks." The plenipotentiary later pointed out to one of Roerich's old university classmates, Georgy Chicherin, that he had "absolutely pro-Soviet leanings, which looked somewhat Buddho-Communistic," and that his son, who spoke 28 Asian languages, helped him in gaining the favor with the Indians and the Tibetans.

The Roerichs settled in New York City, which became the base of their many American operations. They founded several institutions during these years: Cor Ardens ("Flaming Heart") and Corona Mundi ("Crown of the World"), both of which were meant to unite artists around the globe in the cause of civic activism; the Master Institute of United Arts, an art school with a versatile curriculum, and the eventual home of the first Nicholas Roerich Museum; and an American Agni Yoga Society. They also joined various theosophical societies; their activities with these groups dominated their lives.

=== Asian expedition (1925–1929) ===
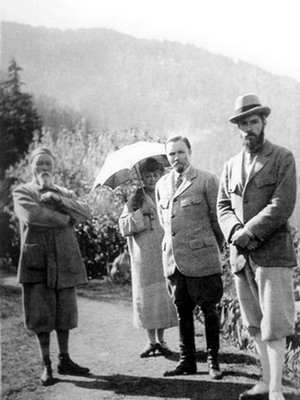
Roerich's family (Kullu valley, India)

After leaving New York, the Roerichs, together with their son George and six friends began the five-year Roerich Asian Expedition that in Roerich's own words "started from Sikkim through Punjab, Kashmir, Ladakh, the Karakoram Mountains, Khotan, Kashgar, Qara Shar, Urumchi, Irtysh, the Altai Mountains, the Oyrot region of Mongolia, the Central Gobi, Kansu, Tsaidam, and Tibet" with a detour through Siberia to Moscow in 1926.

The Roerichs' Asian expedition attracted attention from the foreign services and intelligence agencies of the Soviet Union, the United States, the United Kingdom, and Japan. In fact, prior to this expedition, Roerich had solicited the help of the Soviet government and Bolshevik secret police to assist him in his expedition by promising in return to monitor British activities in the area, but he received only a lukewarm response from Mikhail Trilisser, the chief of the Soviet foreign intelligence.

The Bolsheviks assisted Roerich with logistics while he was traveling through Siberia and Mongolia. However, they did not commit themselves to his reckless project of the Sacred Union of the East, a spiritual utopia that boiled down to Roerich's ambitious attempts to stir the Buddhist masses of inner Asia to create a highly spiritual co-operative commonwealth under the patronage of Bolshevik Russia.

The official mission of his expedition, as Roerich put it, was to act as the embassy of Western Buddhism to Tibet. To the Western media, it was presented as an artistic and scientific enterprise. Roerich reported seeing a metallic oval in the sky over the Tibet; decades later, UFO enthusiasts would claim the Roerich expedition witnessed a "flying saucer".

Between the summer of 1927 and June 1928, the expedition was thought to have been lost, as communication with them had ceased. They had, in fact, been attacked in Tibet. Roerich wrote that only the "superiority of our firearms prevented bloodshed.... In spite of our having Tibet passports, the expedition was forcibly stopped by Tibetan authorities." They were detained by the government for five months and were forced to live in tents in sub-zero conditions and to subsist on meagre rations. Five men of the expedition died during this time. In March 1928 they were allowed to leave Tibet, and they trekked south to settle in India, where they founded a research center, the Himalayan Research Institute.

In 1929 Roerich was nominated for the Nobel Peace Prize by the University of Paris. He received two more nominations in 1932 and 1935.

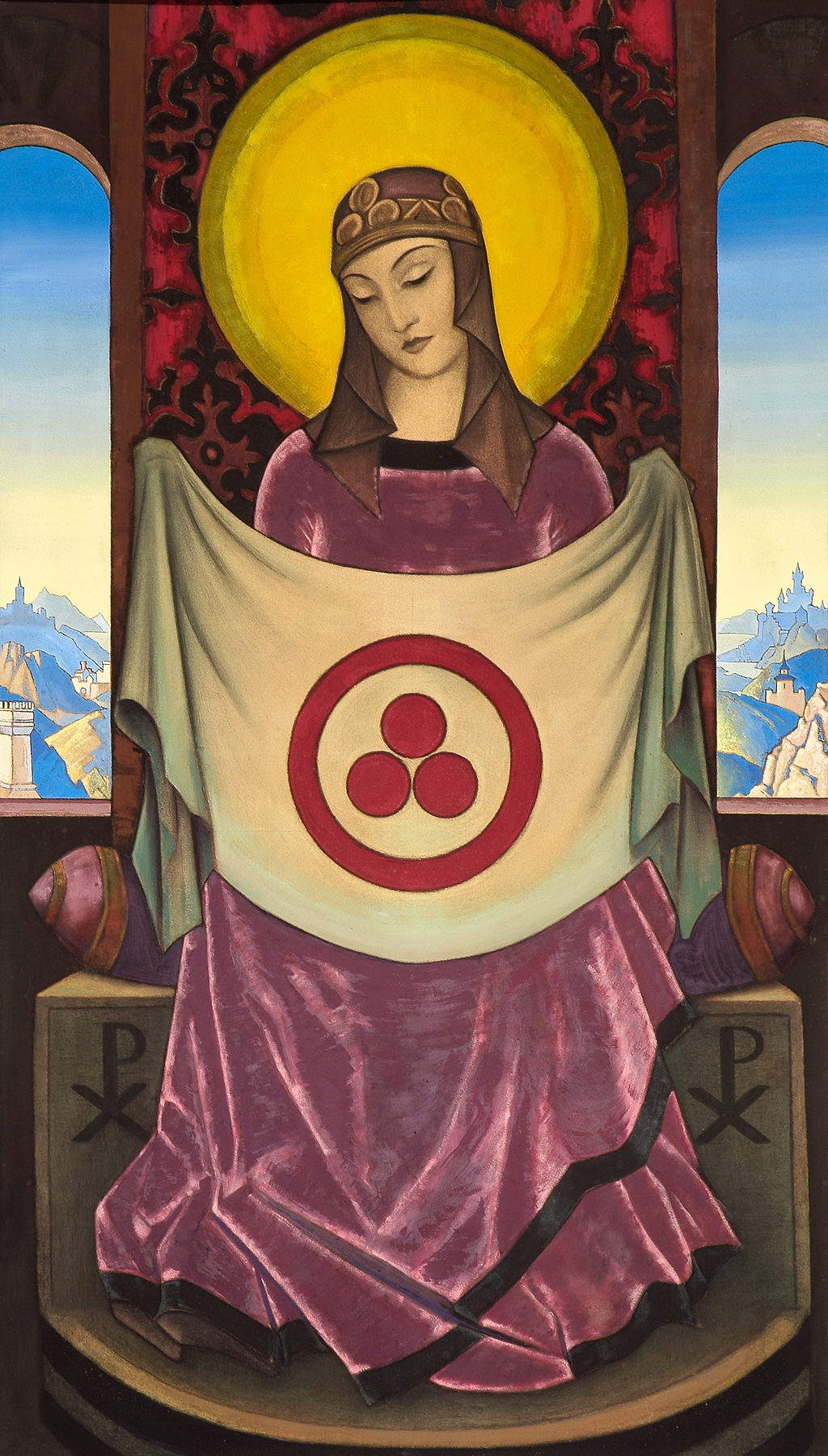
Madonna Oriflamma (1932), She is seen holding the Banner of Peace

His concern for peace resulted in his creation of the Pax Cultura, the "Red Cross" of art and culture. His work for this cause also resulted in the United States and the 20 other nations of the Pan-American Union signing the Roerich Pact, an early international instrument protecting cultural property, on April 15, 1935 at the White House.

=== Manchurian expedition ===
In 1934–1935, the U.S. Department of Agriculture, then headed by the Roerich admirer Henry A. Wallace, sponsored an expedition conducted by Roerich, his wife Helena, and its scientists H. G. MacMillan and James F. Stephens to Inner Mongolia, Manchuria, and mainland China. The expedition's purpose was to collect seeds of plants which prevented soil erosion or which could withstand drought conditions.

The expedition consisted of two parts. In 1934, they explored the Greater Khingan mountains and Bargan plateau in western Manchuria. In 1935, they explored parts of Inner Mongolia: the Gobi Desert, Ordos Desert, and Helan Mountains. The expedition found almost 300 species of xerophytes, collected herbs, conducted archeological studies, and found antique manuscripts of great scientific importance. Despite Roerich's peace activism, reports eventually reached Wallace that the party had been using American-supplied weapons to threaten locals in Mongolia and promising American support for an uprising.

=== Later life ===
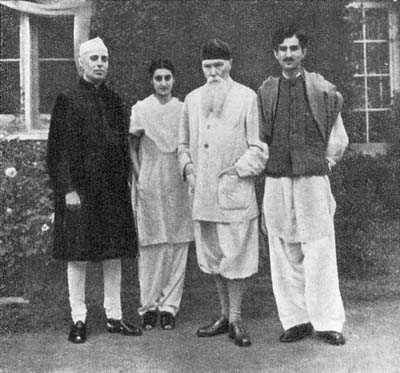
Jawaharlal Nehru, Indira Gandhi, Nicholas Roerich, and Mohammad Yunus. (Roerich's estate, Kullu).

Nicolas Roerich in Naggar, Kullu, India, 1947 (no audio)

Roerich was in India during World War II, where he painted Russian epic heroic and saintly themes, including Alexander Nevsky, The Fight of Mstislav and Rededia, and Boris and Gleb.

In 1942, Roerich received Jawaharlal Nehru and his daughter, Indira Gandhi, at his house in Kullu. Together they discussed the fate of the new world: "We spoke about Indian–Russian cultural association [...] it is time to think about useful and creative co-operation."

Indira Gandhi would later recall several days spent together with Roerich's family: "That was a memorable visit to a surprising and gifted family where each member was a remarkable figure in himself, with a well-defined range of interests.... Roerich himself stays in my memory. He was a man with extensive knowledge and enormous experience, a man with a big heart, deeply influenced by all that he observed."

During the visit, "ideas and thoughts about closer co-operation between India and USSR were expressed. Now, after India wins independence, they have got its own real implementation. And as you know, there are friendly and mutually-understanding relationships today between both our countries."

In 1942, the American–Russian cultural Association (ARCA) was created in New York. Its active participants were Ernest Hemingway, Rockwell Kent, Charlie Chaplin, Emil Cooper, Serge Koussevitzky, and Valeriy Ivanovich Tereshchenko. Its activity was welcomed by scientists such as Robert Millikan and Arthur Compton.

Roerich had a lengthy correspondence with Henry Wallace, the 1948 Progressive Party candidate for US president.

== Death ==
Roerich died in Kullu on December 13, 1947. His wife, philosopher Helena Roerich, wrote about this day: “The day of cremation was exceptionally beautiful. Not a single breath of wind and all surrounding mountains were clad in fresh snowy attire.”

== Cultural legacy ==
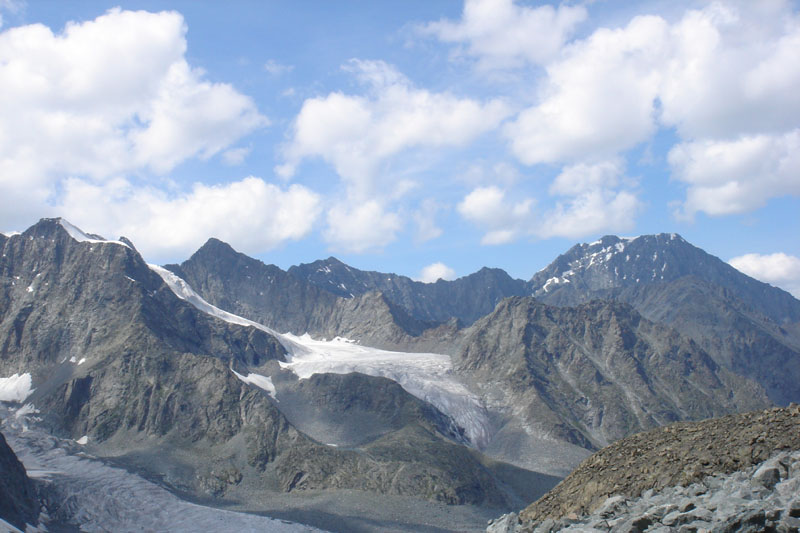
Altai. Peaks and passes named in honor of the Roerich family.

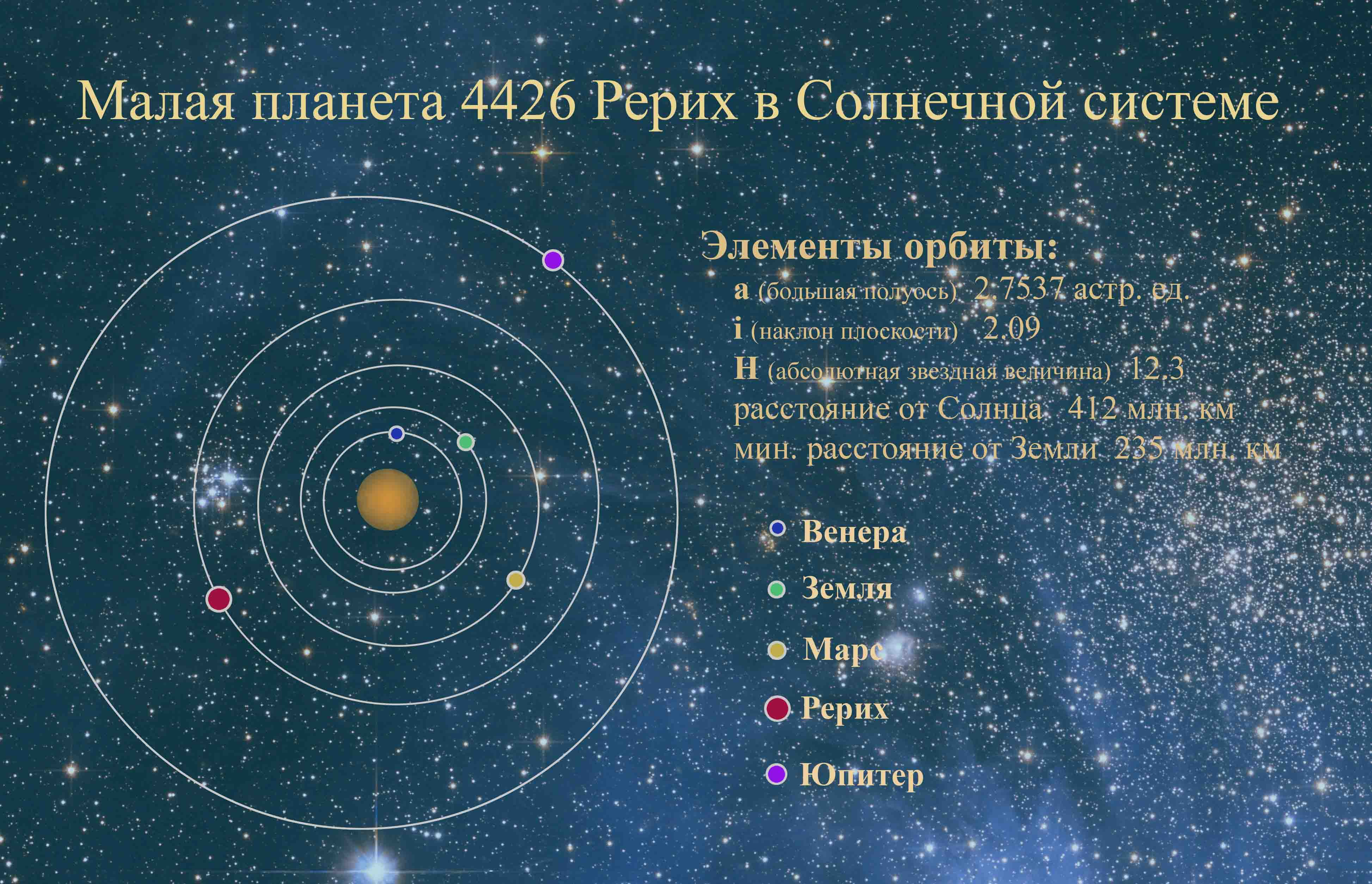
The minor planet 4426 Roerich in Solar System

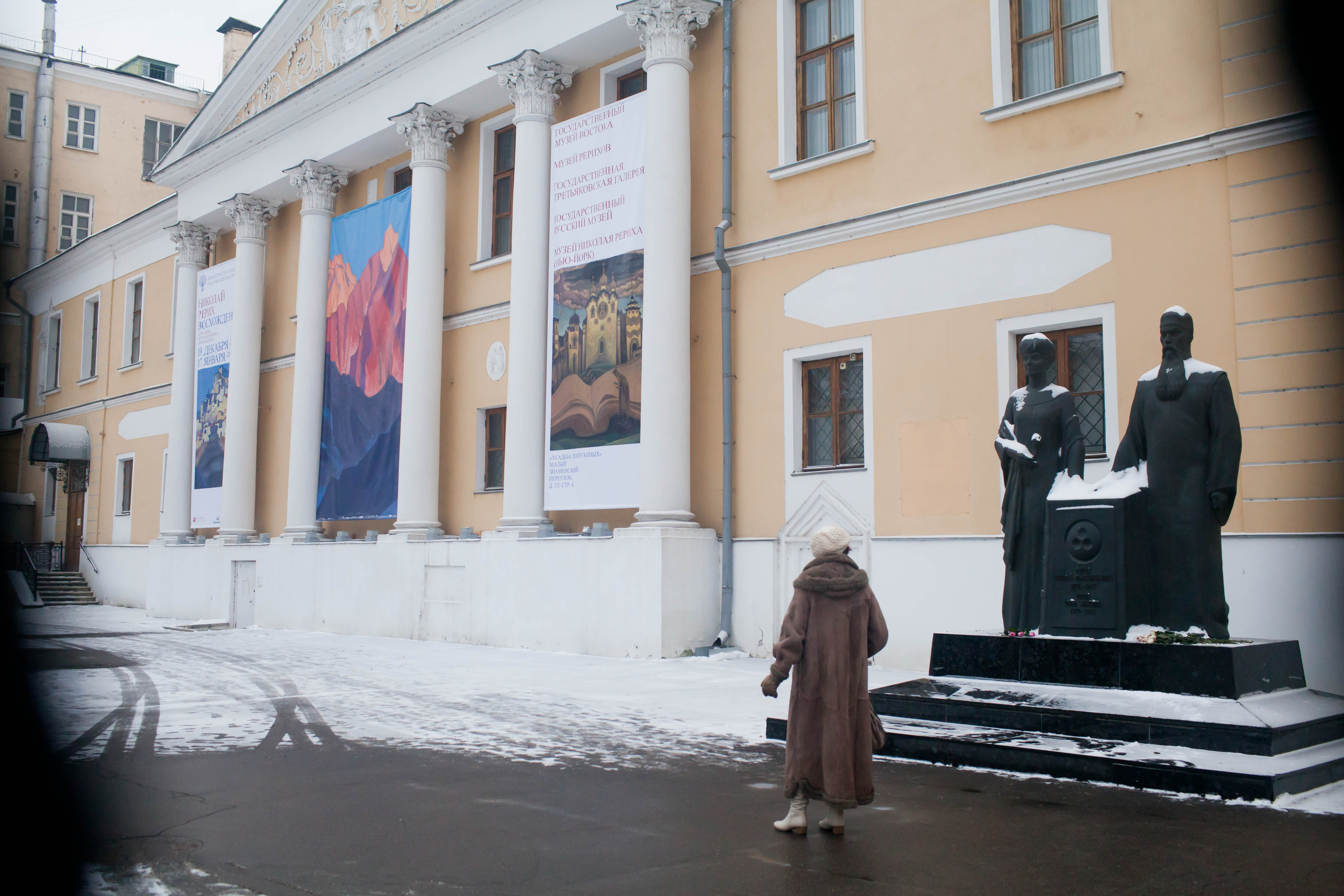
Nicholas Roerich Museum in Moscow, 2018; there is also a Roerich museum in New York City

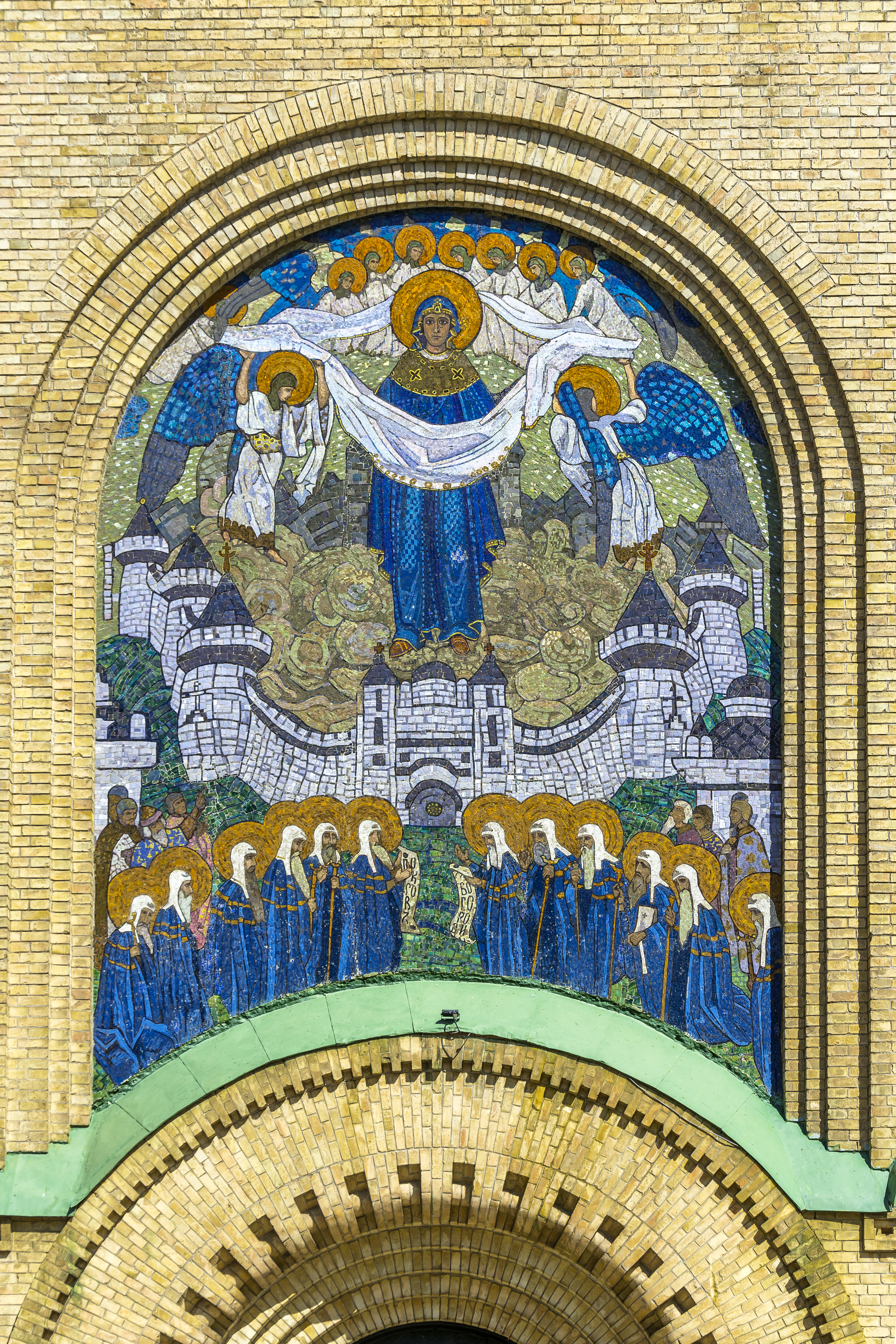
Mosaics of Church of the Intercession, Parkhomivka

In the 21st century, the Nicholas Roerich Museum in New York City is a major institution for Roerich's artistic work. Numerous Roerich societies continue to promote his theosophical teachings worldwide. His paintings can be seen in several museums including the Roerich Department of the State Museum of Oriental Arts in Moscow; the Roerich Museum at the International Centre of the Roerichs in Moscow; the Russian State Museum in Saint Petersburg, Russia; a collection in the Tretyakov Gallery in Moscow; a collection in the Art Museum in Novosibirsk, Russia; an important collection in the National Gallery for Foreign Art in Sofia, Bulgaria; a collection in the Art Museum in Nizhny Novgorod Russia; National Museum of Serbia; the Roerich Hall Estate in Naggar, India; the Sree Chitra Art Gallery, Thiruvananthapuram, India. Major collections of Roerich's paintings in India are preserved at the Bharat Kala Bhavan at Banaras Hindu University in Varanasi, the National Gallery of Modern Art (NGMA) in New Delhi, and the Allahabad Museum in Prayagraj;; and a selection featuring several of his larger works in The Latvian National Museum of Art. A memorial plaque marks the house in Lahaul valley where Roerich lived during summers from 1929 to 1932.

Roerich's biography and his controversial expeditions to Tibet and Manchuria have been examined recently by a number of authors, including two Russians, Vladimir Rosov and Alexandre Andreyev, two Americans (Andrei Znamenski and John McCannon), and the German Ernst von Waldenfels.

A series of his studies on the Himalayan Ranges-donated by the artist's son (36 works specifically) are even showcased in the Nicholas Roerich Gallery of the Karnataka Chitrakala Parishath Museum based in Bangalore, India. The hypnotic, immersive nature of his works truly absorbs the onlooker, leaving one with a sense of peace and tranquility as one moves with the series through the gallery.

H. P. Lovecraft describes Roerich's paintings of Asian mountain landscapes as "strange and disturbing" numerous times in his Antarctic horror story At the Mountains of Madness.

Roerich was awarded Order of St. Sava. The minor planet 4426 Roerich in the Solar System was named in honor of Roerich. A crater on Mercury, near the south pole, is also named for Roerich.

In June 2013 during Russian Art Week in London, Roerich's Madonna Laboris sold at auction at Bonhams shop for £7,881,250, including the buyer's premium, making it the most valuable painting ever sold at a Russian art auction.

== Gallery ==
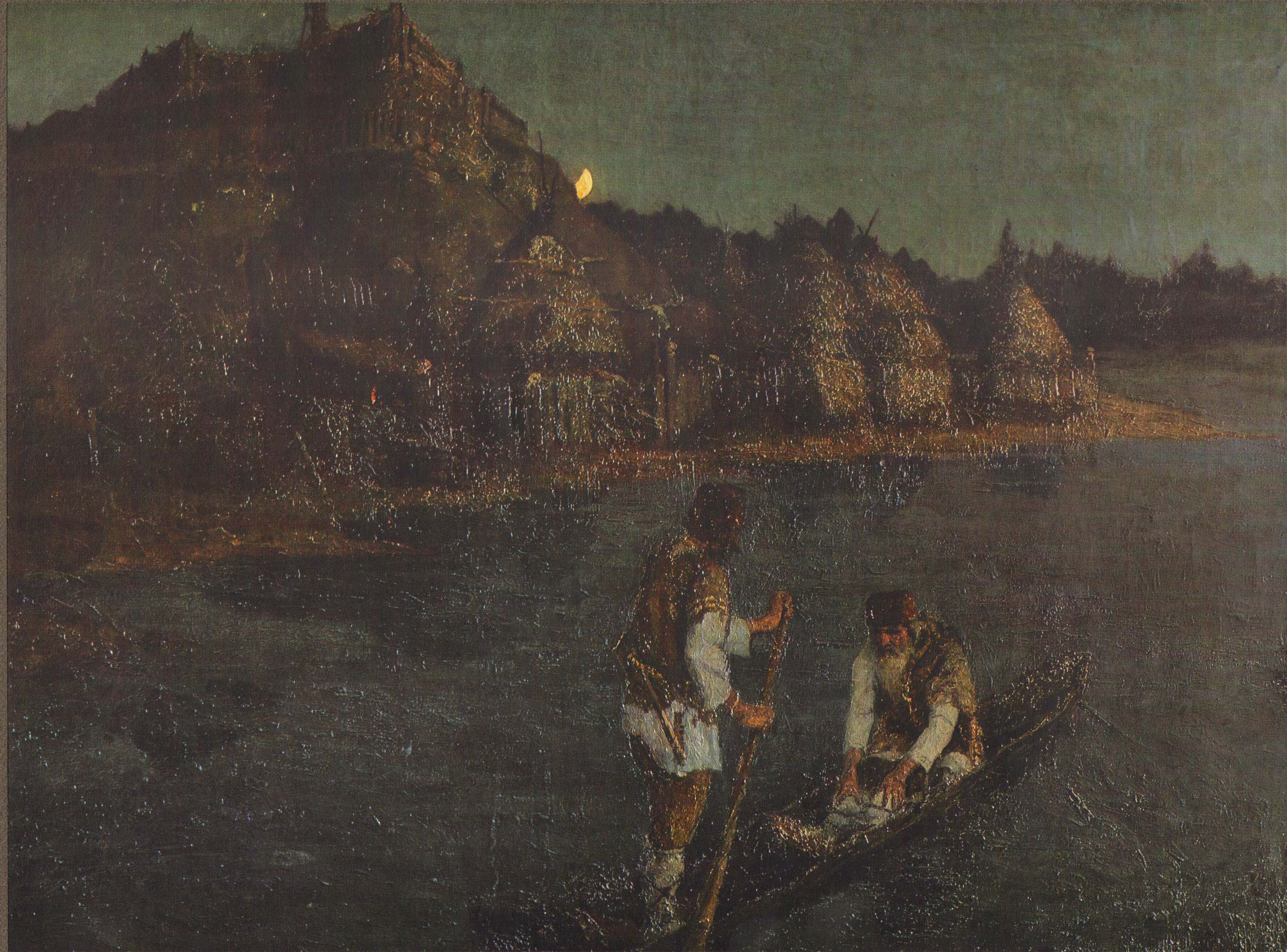
Messenger, 1897

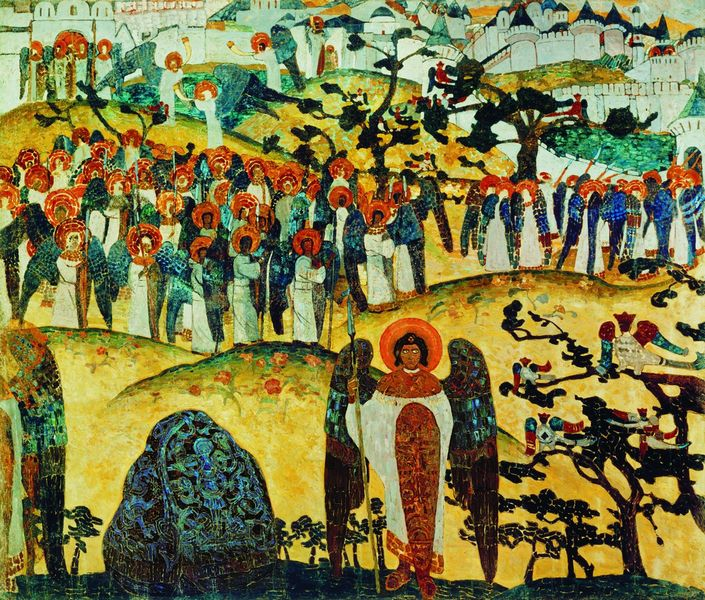
Treasure of angels, 1905

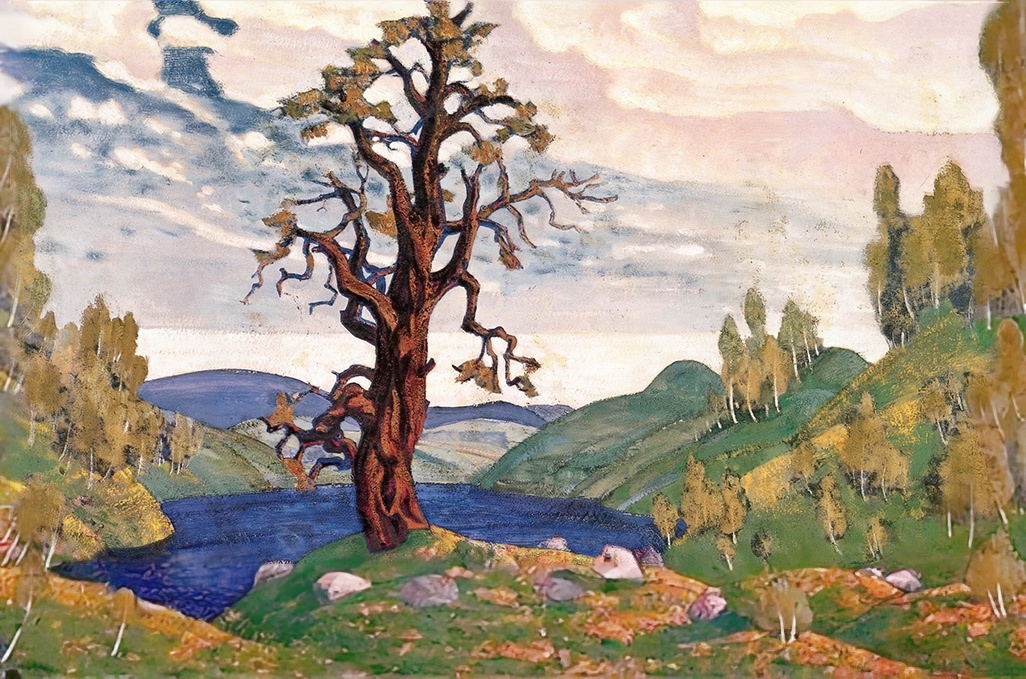
Kiss to the Earth, 1912, scenery for Diaghilev’s The Rite of Spring ballet

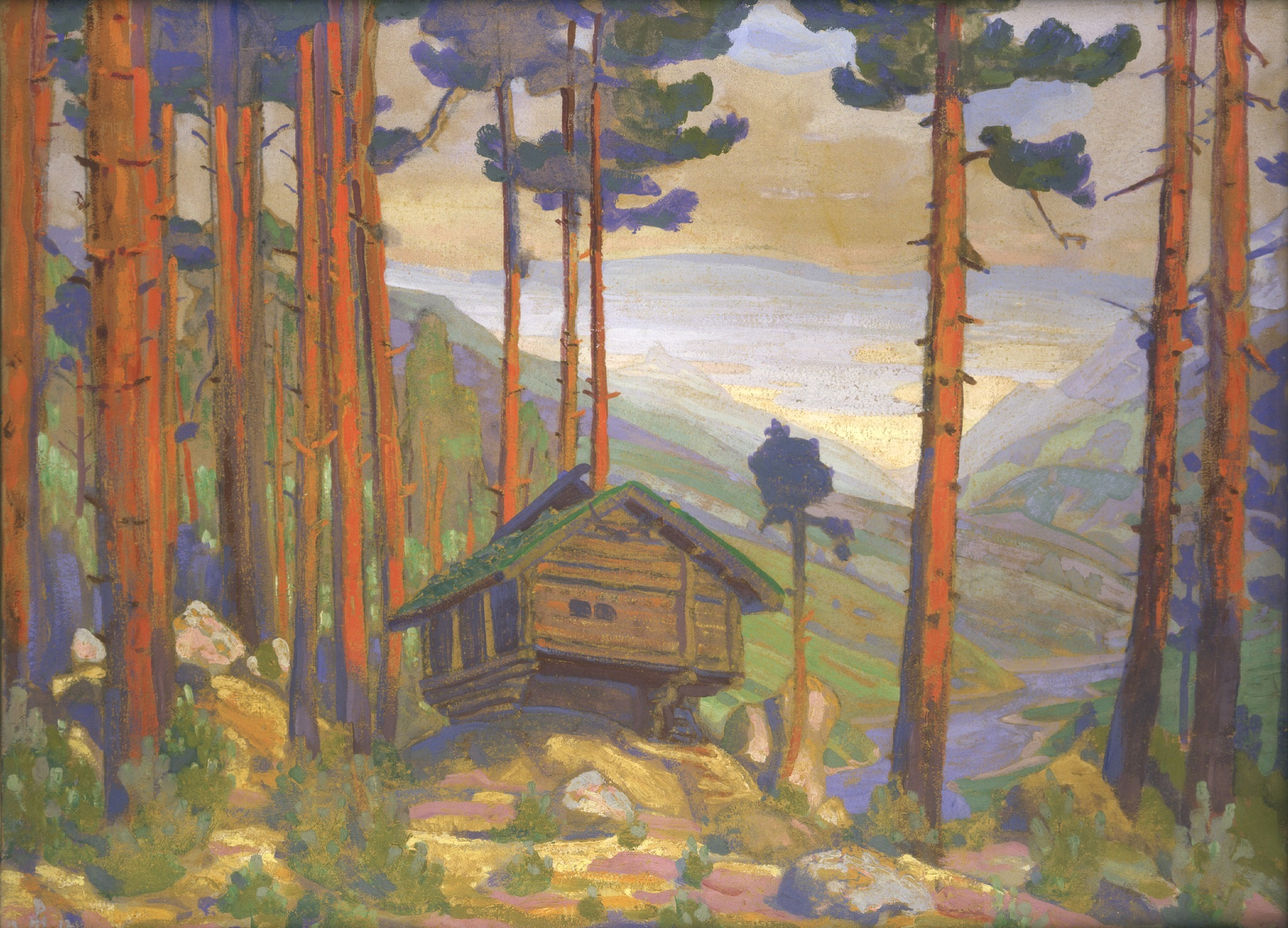
Solveig's Song, 1912

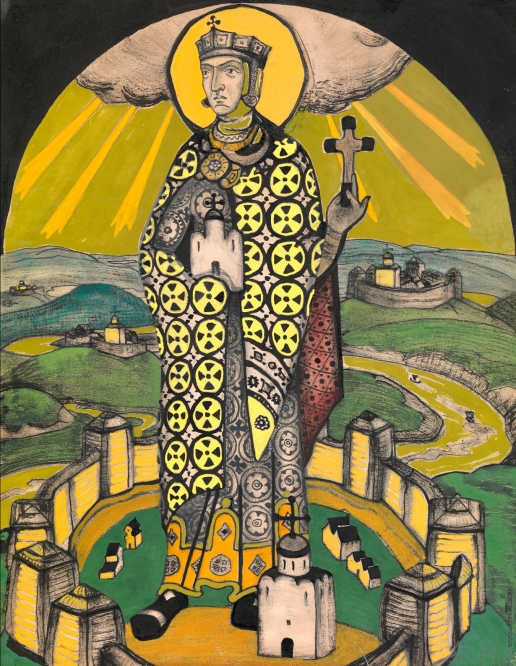
Saint Olga, 1915

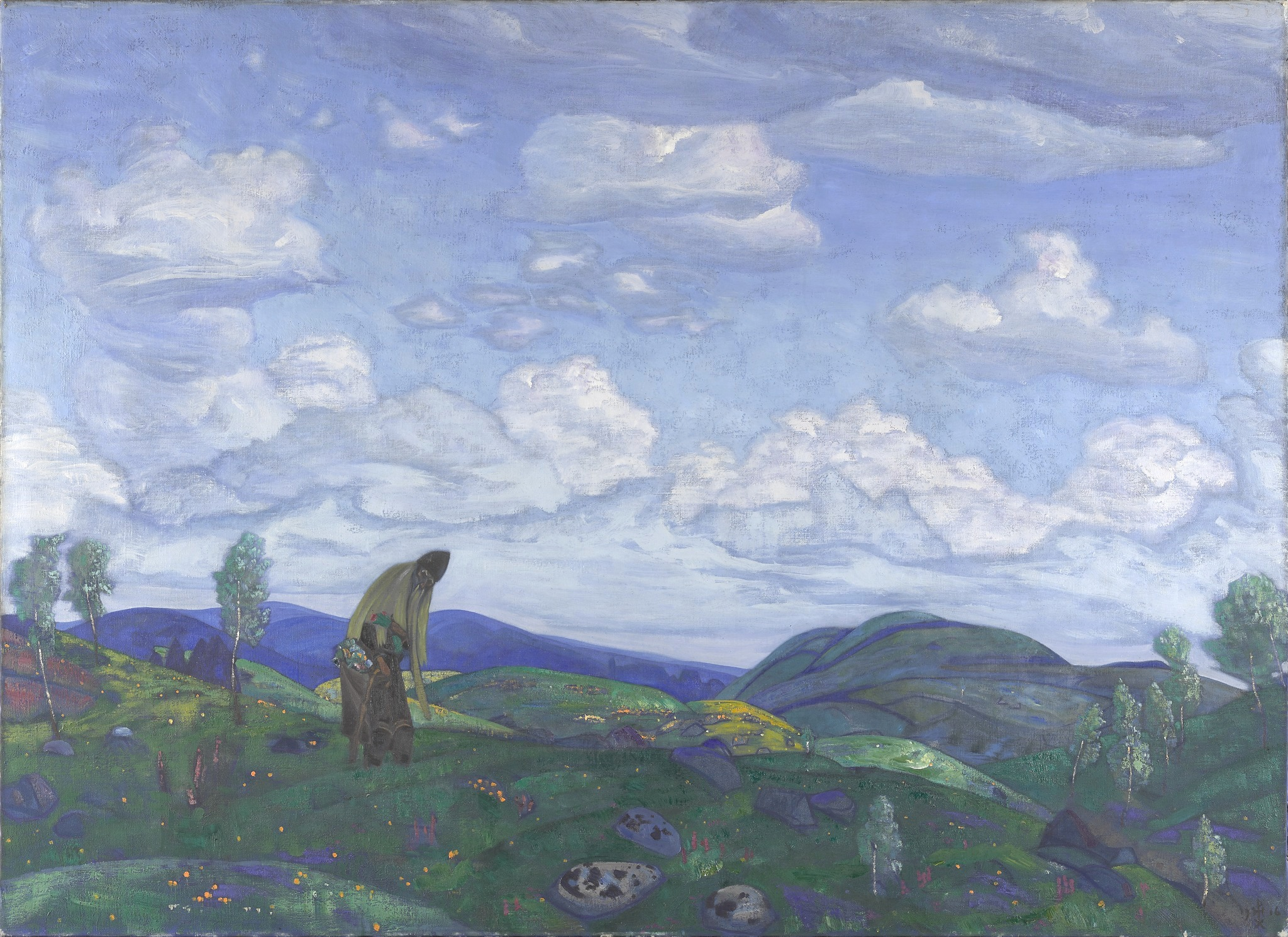
Saint Pantaleon, 1916

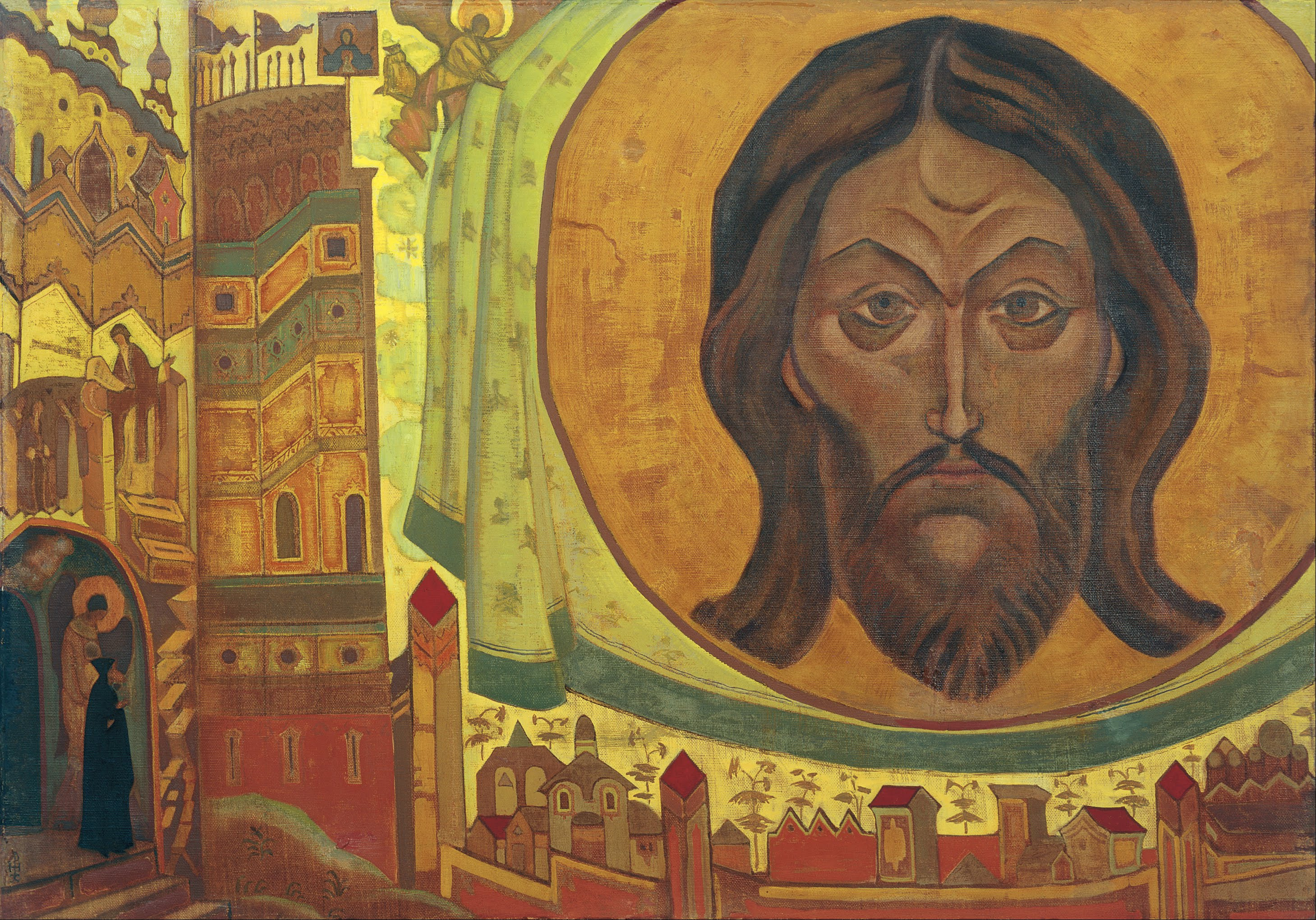
And We See, from the "Sancta" Series, 1922

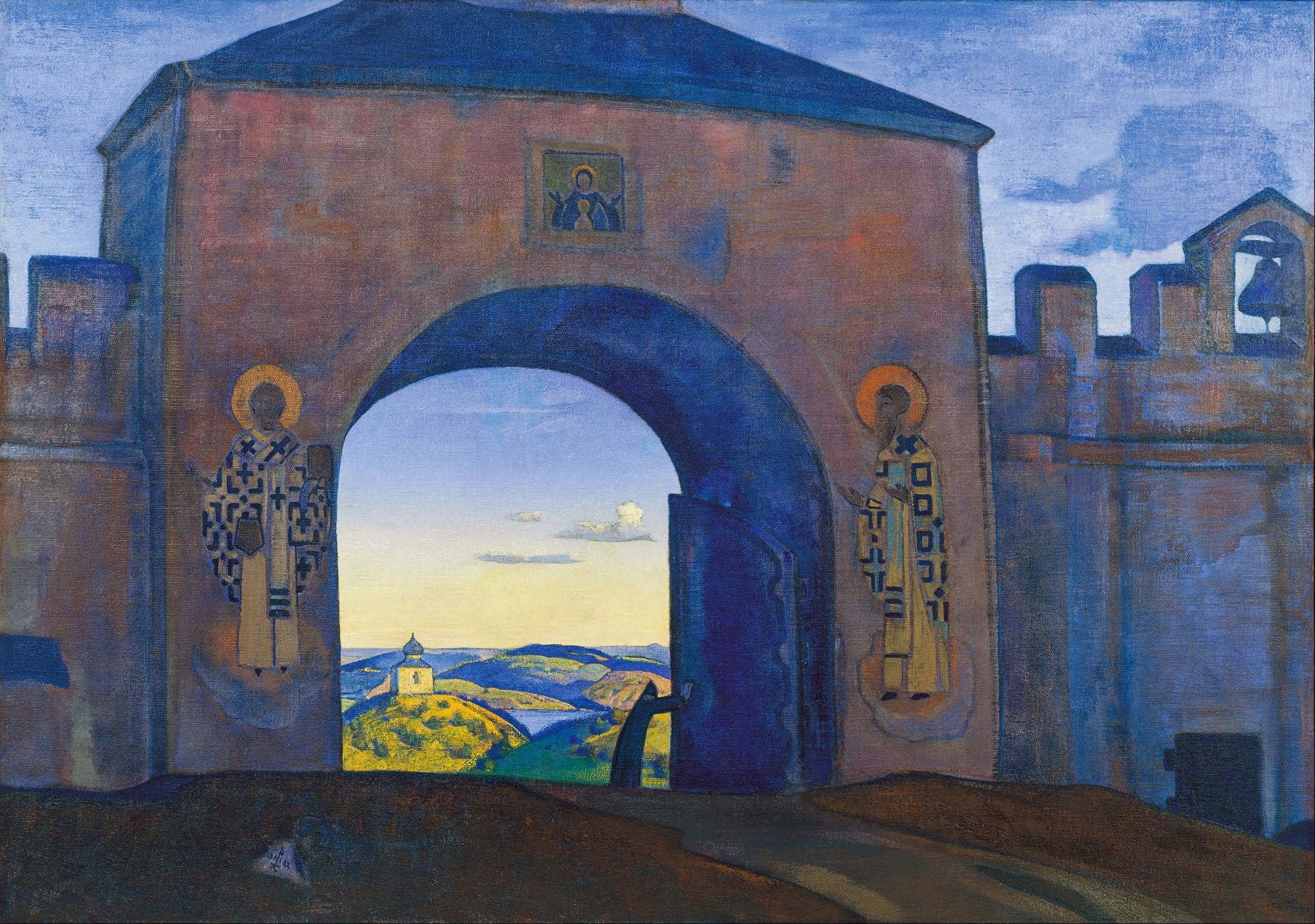
And We Are Opening the Gates, from the "Sancta" Series, 1922

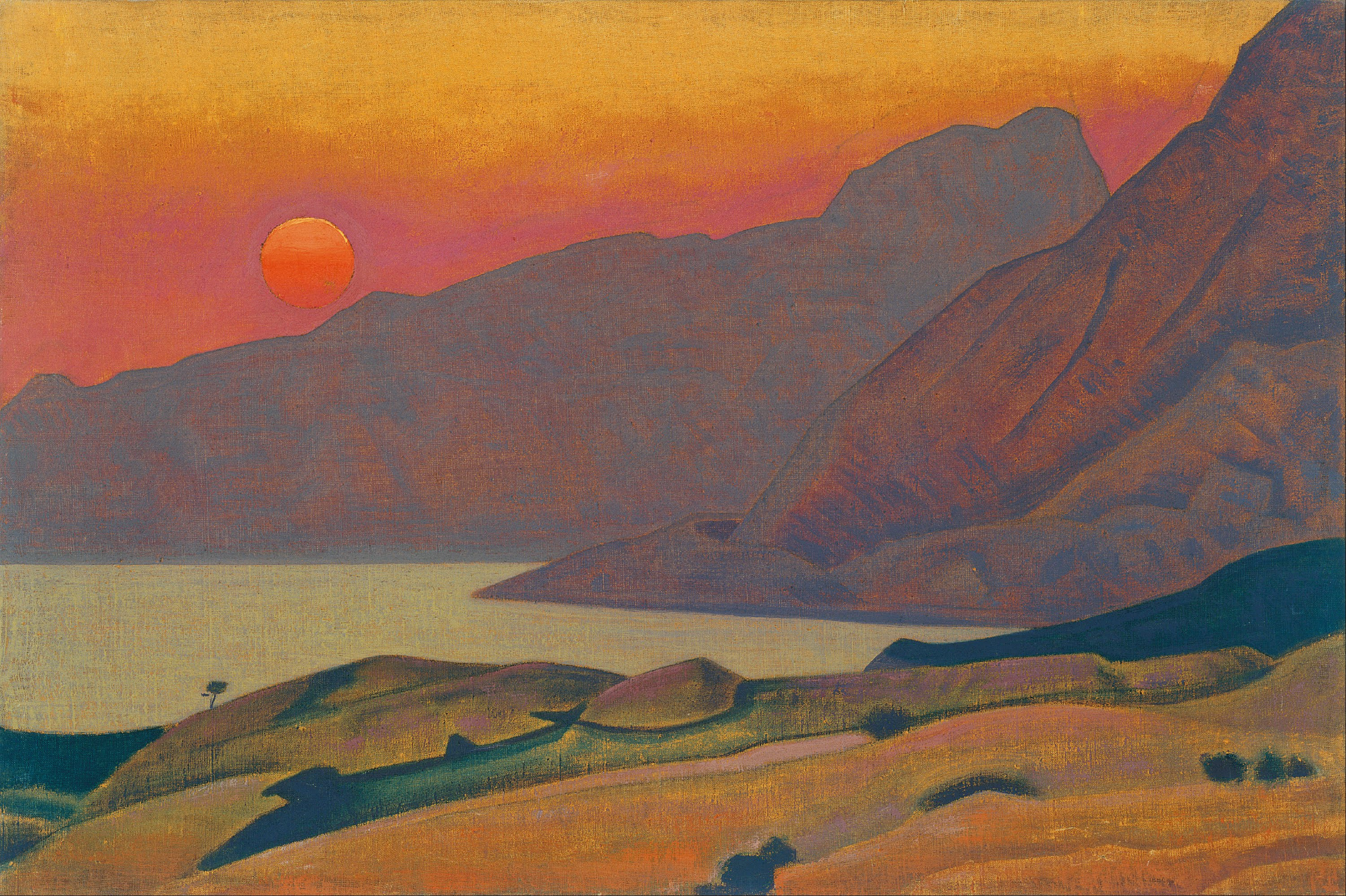
Monhegan, Maine, 1922

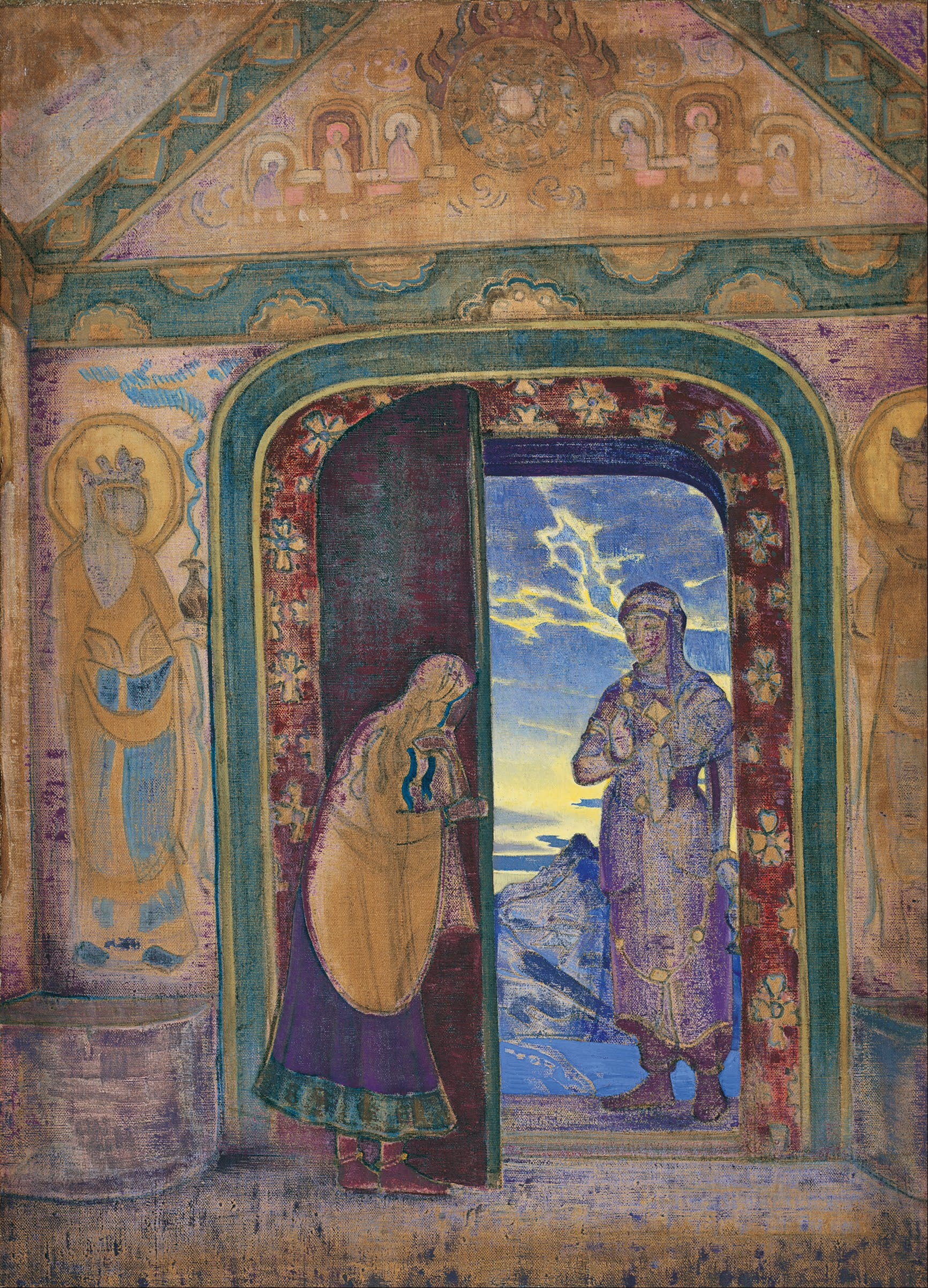
The Messenger, 1922

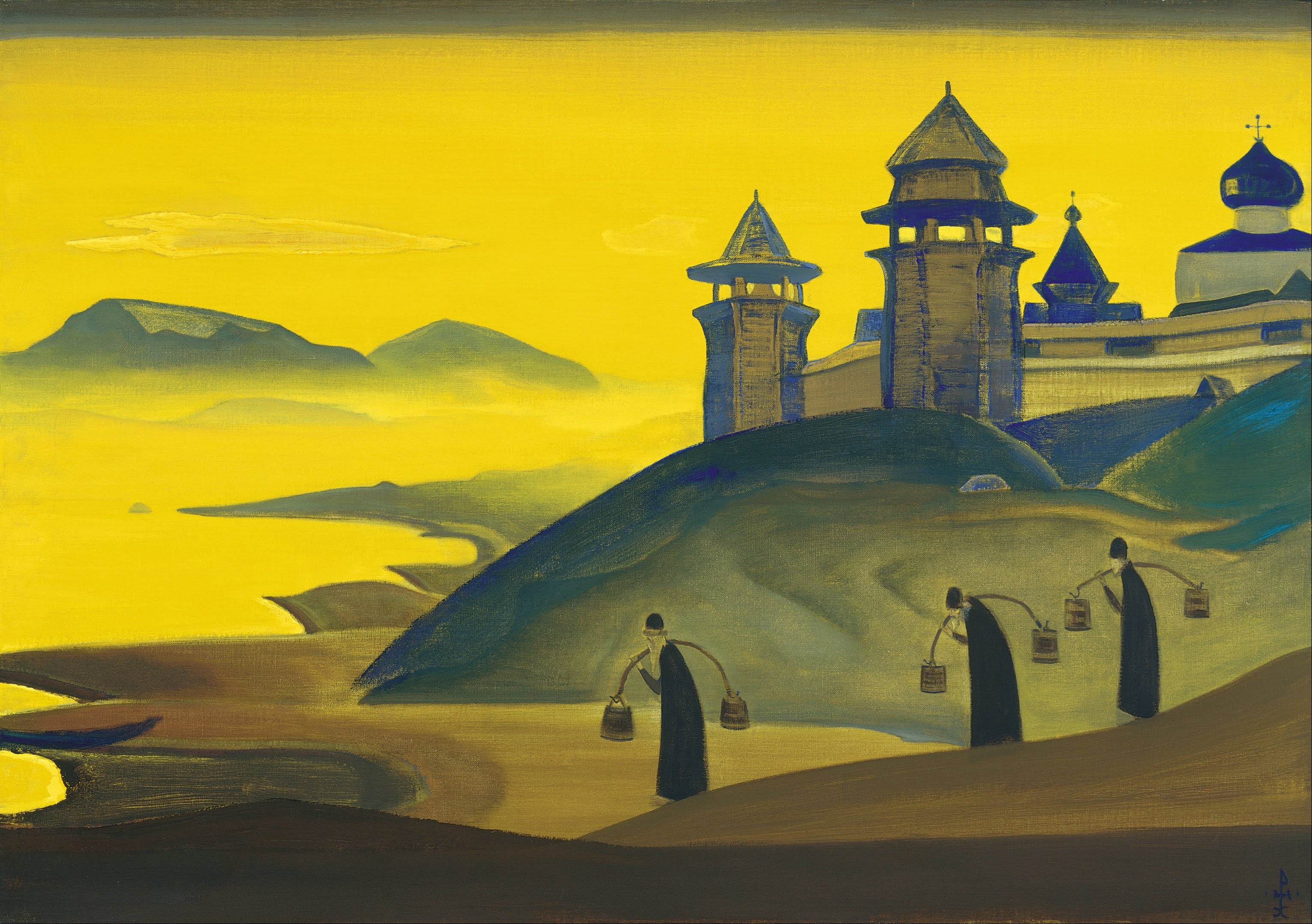
And We Are Trying, from the "Sancta" Series, 1922

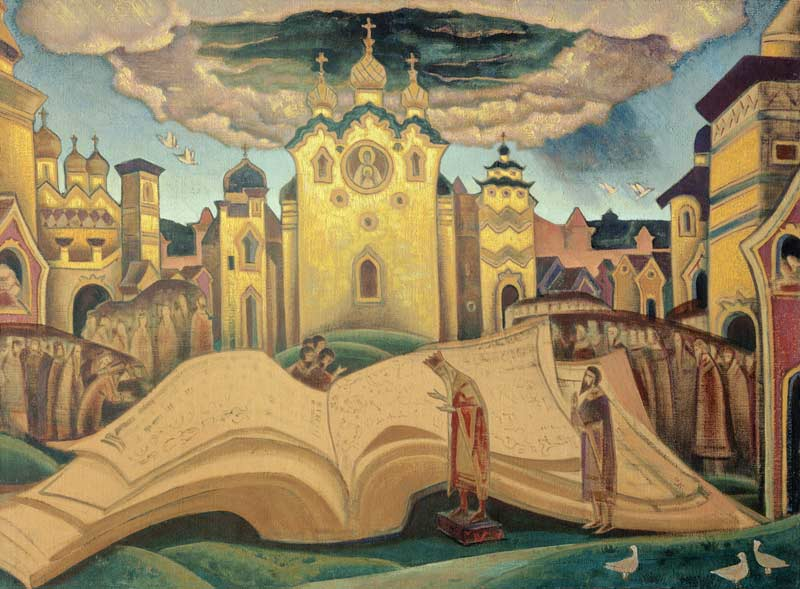
The Pigeon Book (pigeon being used as an adjective), 1922

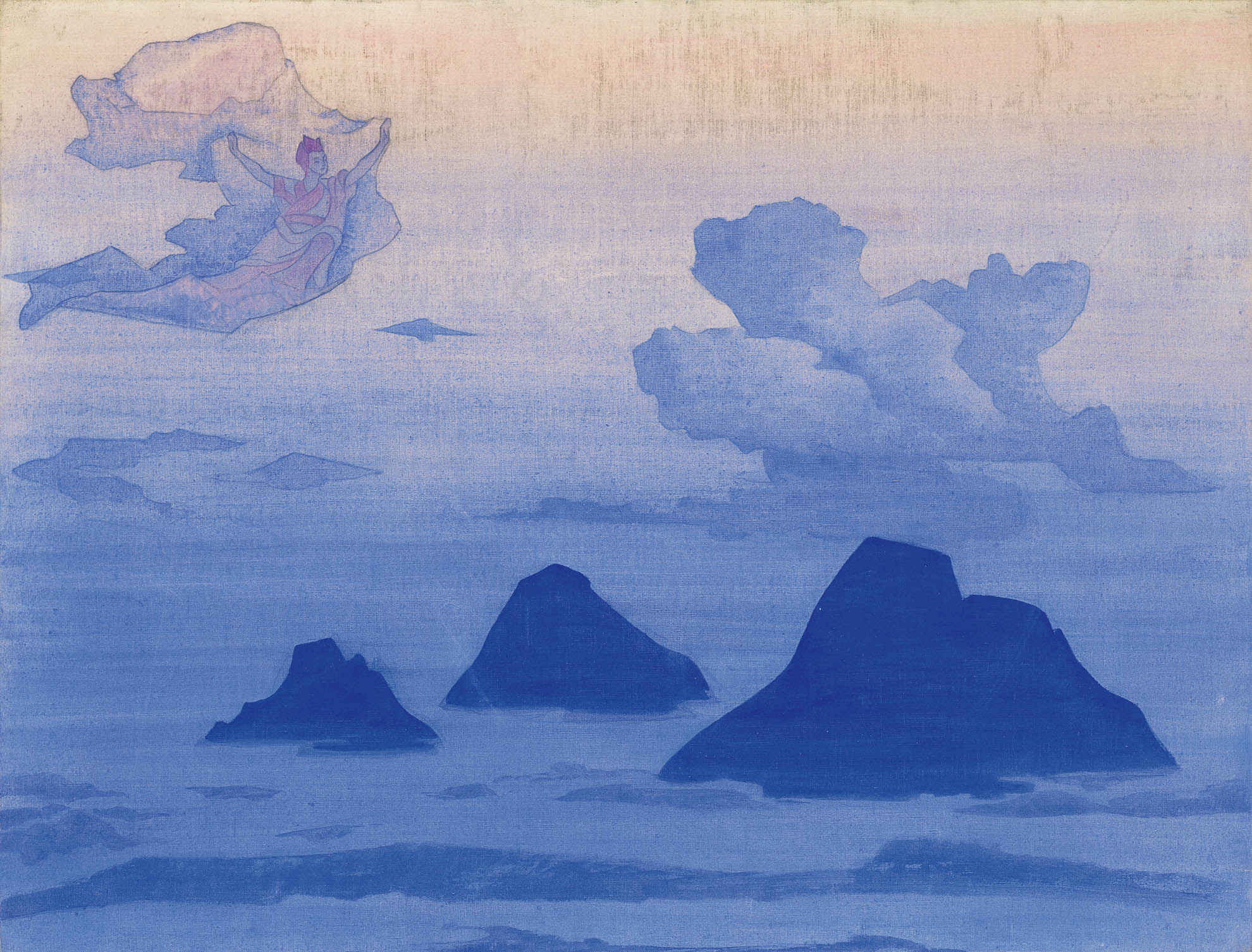
Yama no Ue (Japanese, lit. 'Atop the Mountain'), from the "His Country" series, 1924

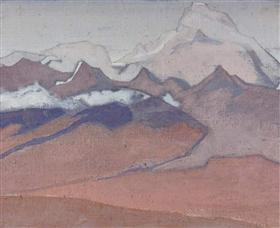
On the Way to Shelkar Dzong, 1928

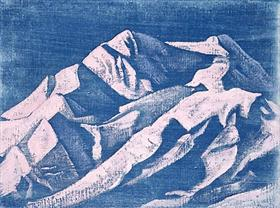
Sunset near Shelkar, 1928

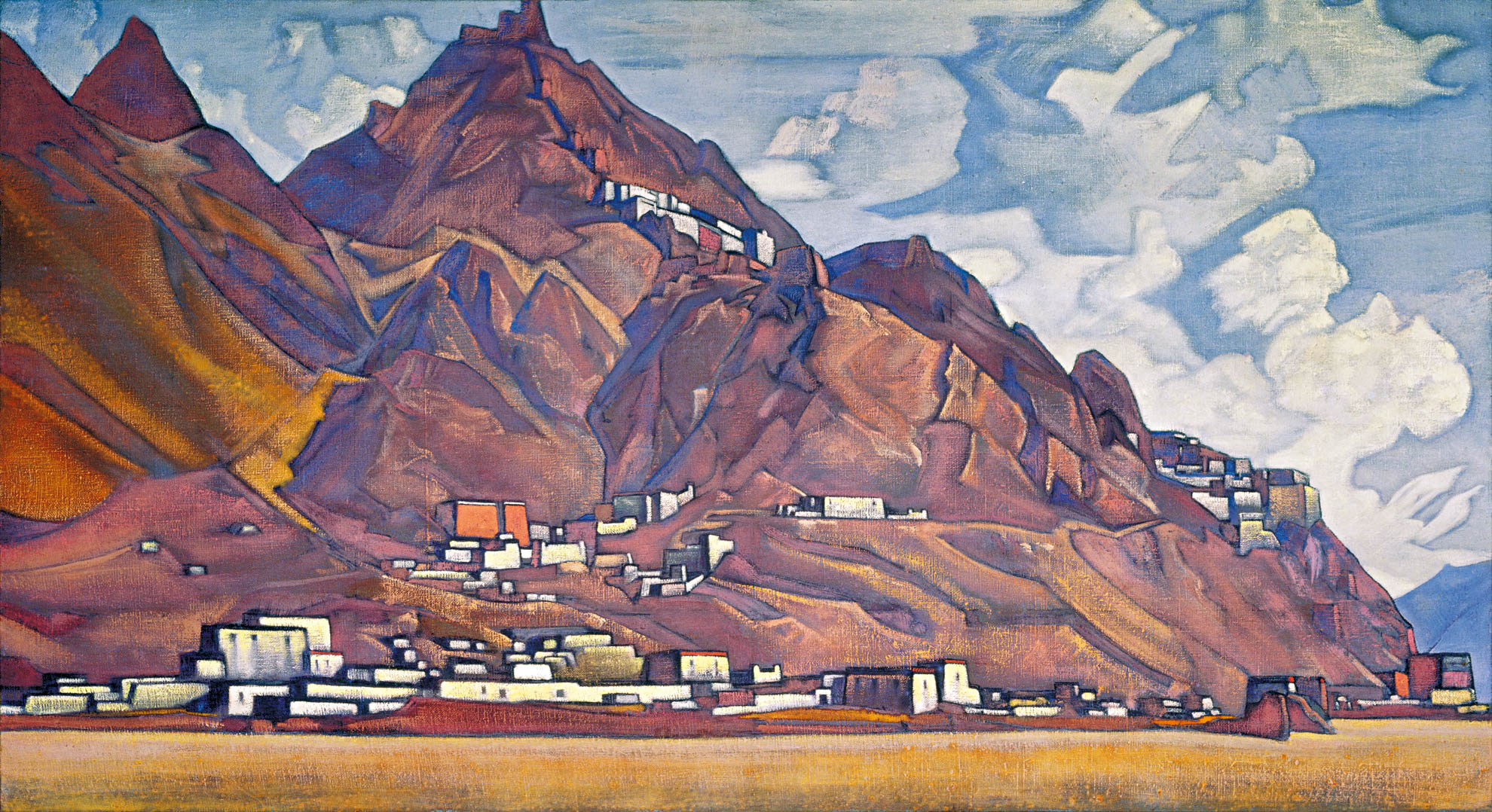
Shelkar Dzong, 1928

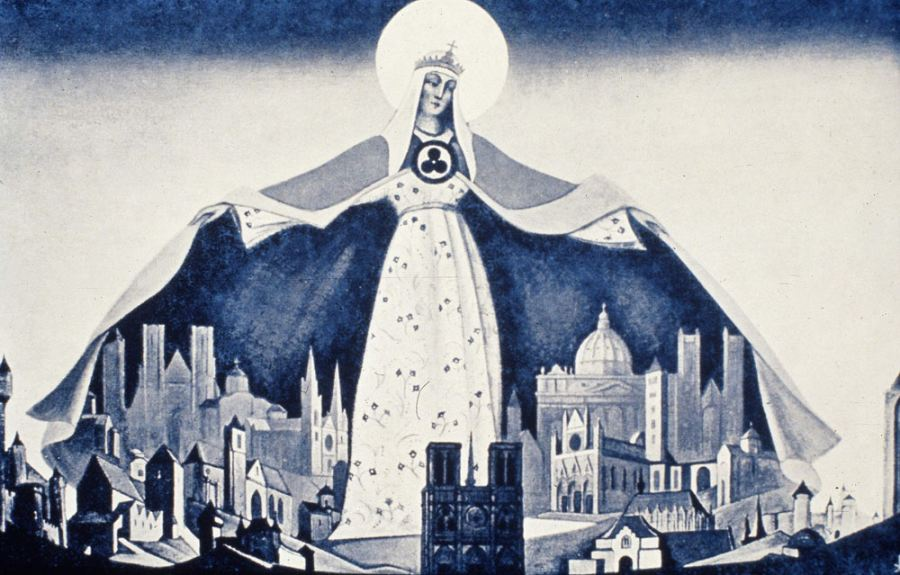
Madonna Protectoris, 1933

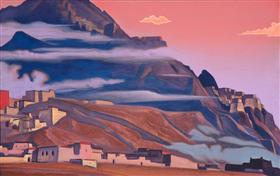
1933 Shelkar Dzong (fortress) and monastery

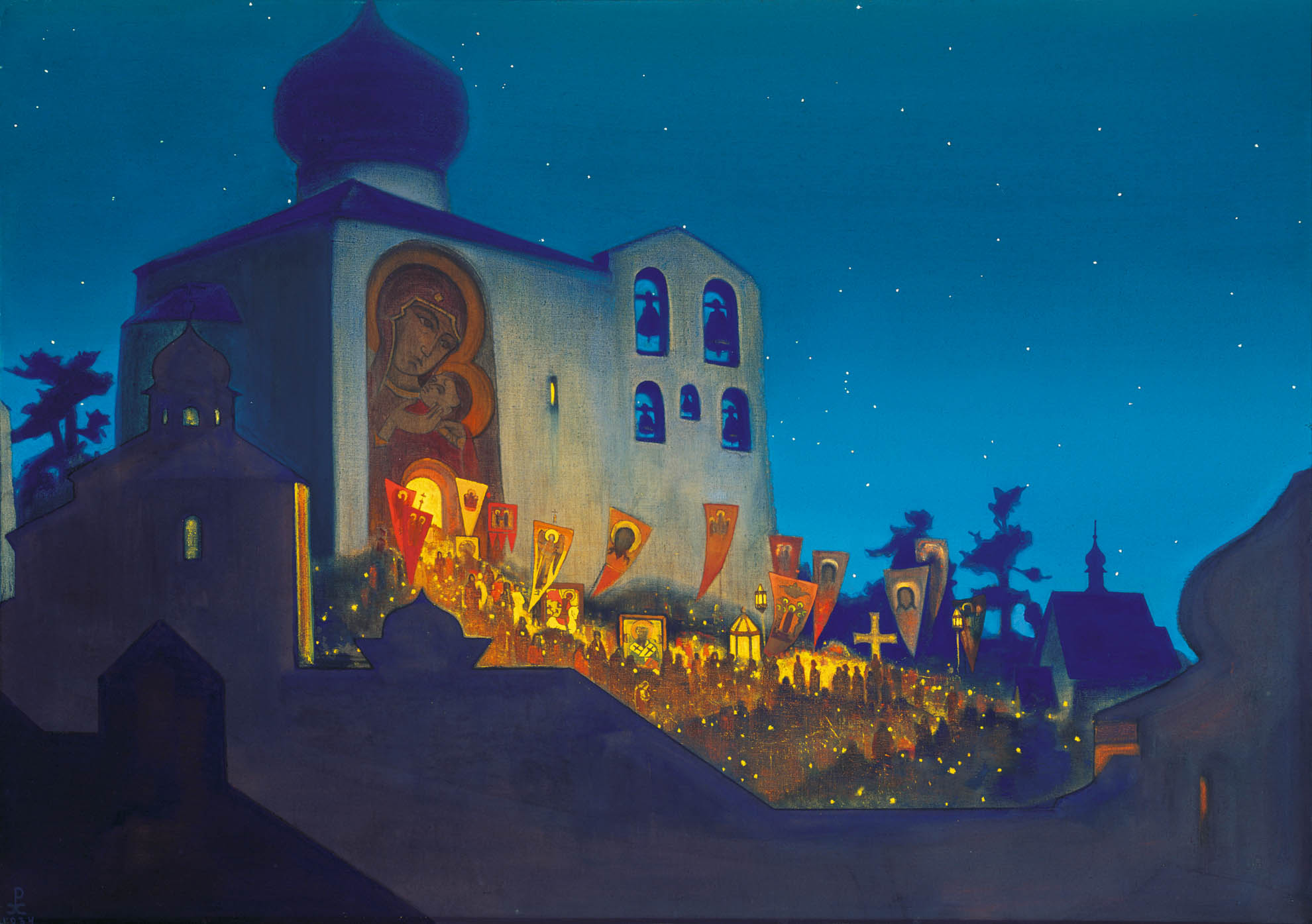
Sky power, 1934

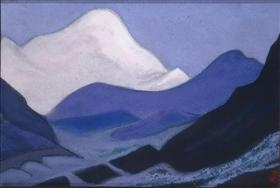
Kampa Dzong Pink Peak, 1938

N. K. Roerich. About Shambala
Phonogram of 1929.

== Major works ==
1. Art and archaeology // Art and art industry. SPb., 1898. No. 3; 1899. No. 4-5.
2. Some ancient Shelonsky fifths and Bezhetsky end. SPb., 31 pages, drawings of the author, 1899.
3. Excursion of the Archaeological Institute in 1899 in connection with the question of the Finnish burials of St. Petersburg province. SPb., 14 p., 1900.
4. Some ancient stains Derevsky and Bezhetsk. SPb., 30 p., 1903.
5. In the old days, St. Petersburg., 1904,18 p., drawings of the author.
6. Stone age on lake piros., SPb., ed. "Russian archaeological society", 1905.
7. Collected works. kN. 1. M.: publishing house of I. D. Sytin, p. 335, 1914.
8. Tales and parables. Pg.: Free art, 1916.
9. Violators of Art. London, 1919.
10. The Flowers Of Moria. . Berlin: Word, 128 p., Collection of poems. 1921.
11. Adamant. New York: Corona Mundi, 1922
12. Ways Of Blessing. New York, Paris, Riga, Harbin: Alatas, 1924
13. Altai - Himalayas. (Thoughts on a horse and in a tent) 1923–1926. Ulan Bator Khoto, 1927.
14. Heart of Asia. Southbury (St. Connecticut): Alatas, 1929.
15. Flame in Chalice. Series X, Book 1. Songs and Sagas Series. New York: Roerich Museum Press, 1930.
16. Shambhala. New York: F. A. Stokes Co., 1930
17. Realm of Light. Series IX, Book II. Sayings of Eternity Series. New York: Roerich Museum Press, 1931.
18. The Power Of Light. Southbury: Alatas, New York, 1931.
19. Women. Address on the occasion of the opening of the Association of women, Riga, ed. About Roerich, 1931, 15 p., 1 reproduction.
20. The Fiery Stronghold. Paris: World League Of Culture, 1932.
21. Banner of peace. Harbin, Alatyr, 1934.
22. Holy Watch. Harbin, Alatyr, 1934.
23. A gateway to the Future. Riga: Uguns, 1936.
24. Indestructible. Riga: Uguns, 1936.
25. Roerich Essays: One hundred essays. В 2 т. India, 1937.
26. Beautiful Unity. Bombey, 1946.
27. Himavat: Diary Leaveves. Allahabad: Kitabistan, 1946.
28. Himalayas — Adobe of Light. Bombey: Nalanda Publ, 1947.
29. Diary sheets. Vol. 1 (1934-1935). M: ICR, 1995.
30. Diary sheets. Vol. 2 (1936-1941). M: ICR, 1995.
31. Diary sheets. Vol. 3 (1942-1947). M: ICR, 1996.

== See also ==
- Agni Yoga
- Banner of Peace
- List of peace activists
- Morya (Theosophy)
- Russian cosmism
- Roerichism
