= Princess Maria Tenisheva =

Russian princess (1858–1928)

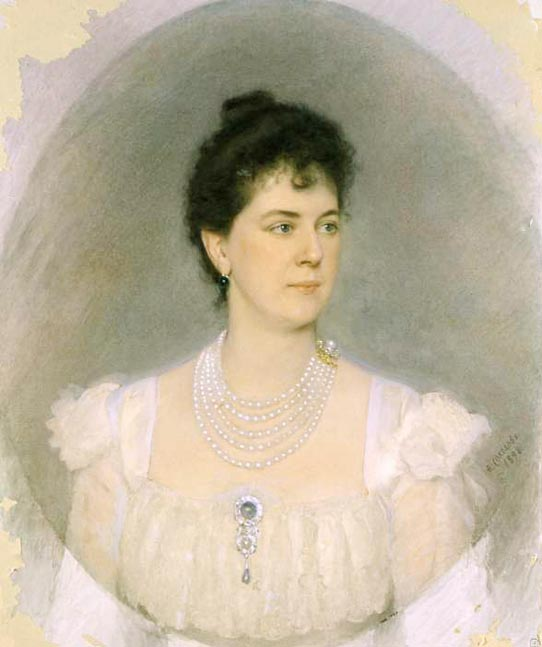
Princess Maria Tenisheva, by Alexander P. Sokolov, 1898

Princess Maria Klavdievna Tenisheva (née Pyatkovskaya, in the first marriage – Nikolaeva, (20 May 1858 – 14 April 1928) was a Russian noblewoman, primarily renowned for her work as philanthropist and art collector during tsars Alexander III and Nicholas II's reigns. Maria Tenisheva is notable as the founder of the Art studio in Saint Petersburg, and the Drawing School at the Museum of Russian antiquity in Smolensk, handicraft college in Bezhitsa town, as well as by artistic and industrial workshops held in her own estate of Talashkino.

== Biography ==
Maria Pyatkovskaya was born on 20 May (1 June) 1858 in Saint Petersburg. Born illegitimately, she was raised at her stepfather's wealthy house; she was quite a shy girl, despite many governesses, nurses and teachers present in the house. Little Maria was expected to be obedient and restraint. His mother was cold to her, apparently binding to this child the moments of her life which she was trying to forget.

When 16-year-old Maria graduated from private school, Rafail Nikolaev, a young lawyer, proposed to her. The idea that the marriage would give her freedom pushed her to give her consent. The couple had a daughter, also named Maria, but the marriage did not work out, as the husband was a gambler. "Everything was so gray and ordinary, meaningless," she wrote later.

Soon Maria Tenisheva went to Paris to study singing with the Mathilde Marchesi. Maria also took her little daughter to France. However, her husband refused to grant her permit to leave and her mother also terminated her allowance.

In addition to singing lessons with Marchesi, Maria also took graphics lessons. Marchesi was sure that her student was born to have the glory of Russian opera singer. Maria was offered to take a tour of France and Spain. But due to a conflict with the entrepreneur, Maria refused to go, moreover, she decided that singing and stage performance were not for her.

Upon returning to Saint Petersburg, she attended Baron von Stieglitz classes. At the time, Maria studied the history of art and spent time reading books and visiting museums.

In 1892, Maria married Prince Vyacheslav Nikolayevich Tenishev, an outstanding Russian manufacturer. However, his relatives did not recognize Maria, and she was not inscribed into the Tenishev genealogy. The couple settled in the Khotylevo estate acquired by Prince Tenishev in Bryansky district, Orel province.

The estate was situated on the banks of the Desna river, where the princess founded a one-class school.

Princess Tenisheva had great artistic taste. She collected watercolors and befriended famous artists, including Viktor Vasnetsov, Mikhail Vrubel, Nicholas Roerich, Sergey Malyutin, Alexandre Benois, the sculptor Paolo Troubetzkoy, and many others. She set up an art studio to prepare young people for higher arts education in Saint Petersburg (1894–1904), where Ilya Repin taught.

Maria Tenisheva was also one of the founders of the Mir Iskusstva (World of Arts) magazine.

When traveling with her husband to Europe, the princess had no financial restraints and bought Western European paintings, porcelain, marble sculptures, jewelry, and historic valuables of China, Japan and Iran. When she and her husband went traveling through the old Russian towns of Rostov, Rybinsk, Kostroma, and the Volga region villages and monasteries, the handmade beauty crafted by unknown masters made her start a collection of utensils, clothing, furniture, jewelry, and glassware.

In 1893, Maria Tenisheva persuaded her friend, Princess Catherine Svyatopolk-Chetverinskaya, to sell her ancestral estate Talashkino, and there she quickly created a welcoming, creative atmosphere that attracted many famous artists, musicians, and scientists, including Ilya Repin, Nicholas Roerich, Mikhail Vrubel. Talashkino became the princess's lifework. In September 1895, thanks to the princess's efforts to erect a new building with dormitories, a dining room and a kitchen, a school opened for village children near Talashkino. Orphans had privileged entry, and Princess Tenisheva gave them full pension.

In 1919, after the Russian Revolution, Princess Maria Tenisheva, together with her friend, Princess Catherine Svyatopolk-Chetverinskaya, and her assistants, left Russia for France. During her exile in Paris, she wrote her memoir, called Impressions of My Life. Memories, that covered the period from the late 1860s to New Year's Eve 1917. The book was published only after her death.

== Death ==
Princess Maria Tenisheva died on 14 April 1928, in her house "Iris Cottage", located in the Parisian suburb of La Celle Saint-Cloud. In the obituary, Ivan Bilibin wrote: "Her whole life was dedicated to native Russian art, and she has done infinitely much for it."

== See also ==
- List of people from Saint Petersburg
- List of philanthropists
