= Bibishki =

Rural locality in Smolensk Oblast, Russia

Coordinates: 55°03′N 33°22′E

Bibishki (Russian: Бибишки) is a rural locality (a village) in Safonovsky District of Smolensk Oblast, Russia, located 7 kilometers (4.3 mi) southeast of Safonovo and 12 kilometers (7.5 mi) south of the M1 "Belarus" Highway, on the right bank of the Vopets River. Population: 16 (2007 est.); area: 0.34 square kilometers (0.13 sq mi)
