= Talashkino =

Selo in Smolensky, Smolensk, Russia

Coordinates: 54.6561°N 32.1853°E

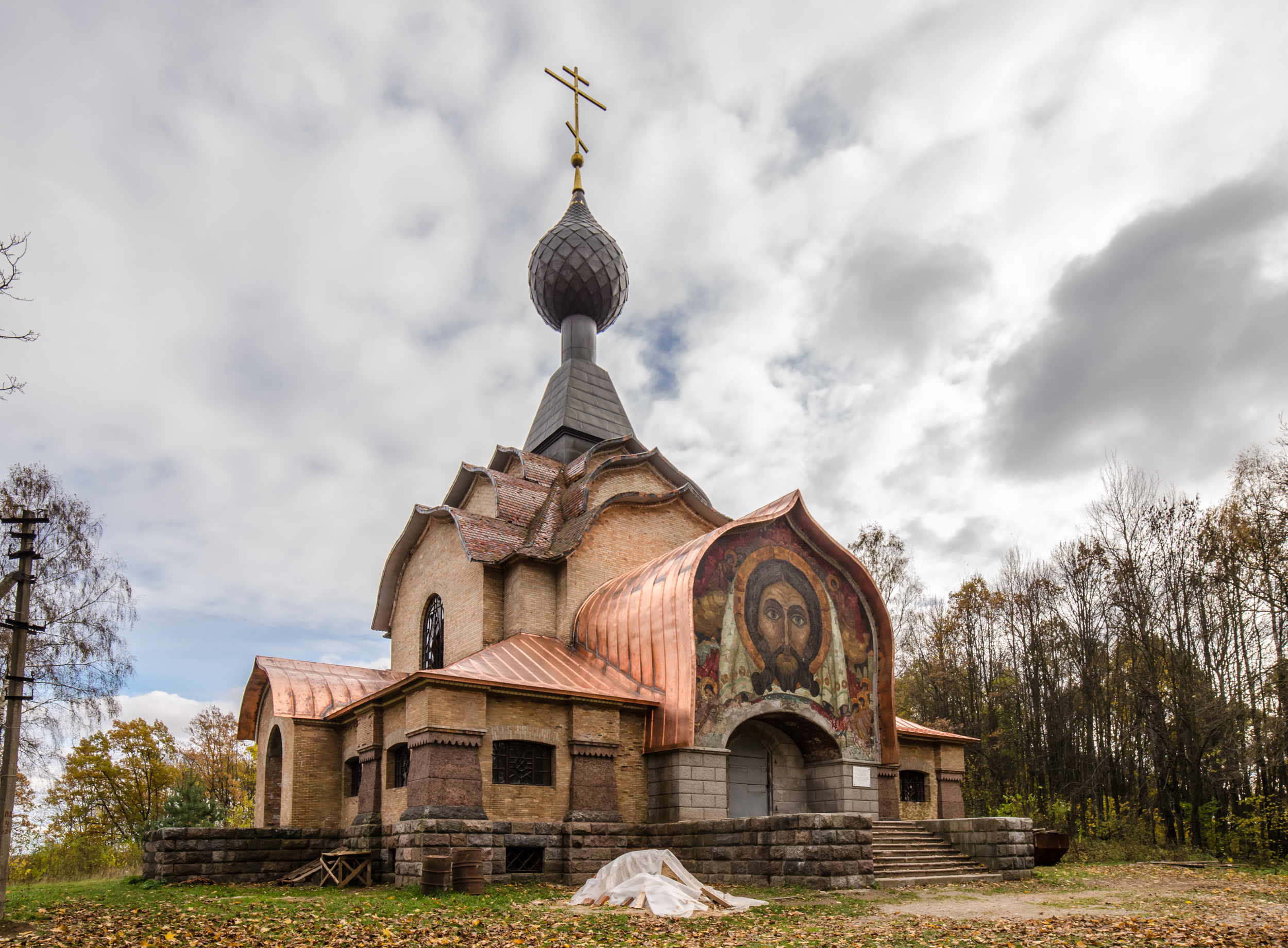
The Church of the Holy Spirit

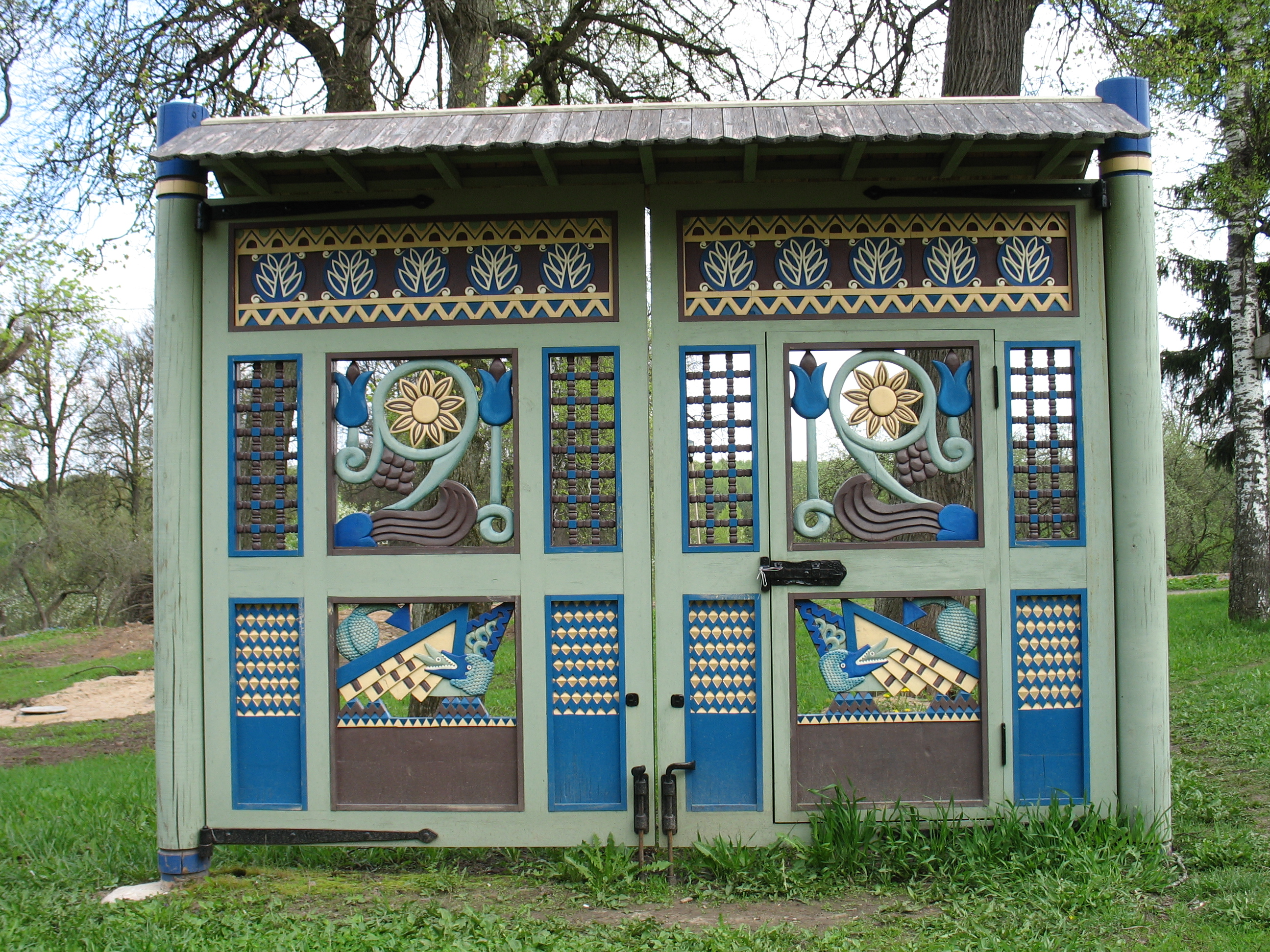
The gate of the Talashkino estate

Talashkino (Russian: Талашкино) is a selo in Smolensky District, Smolensk Oblast, Russia, located 18 kilometres (11 mi) southeast of Smolensk. Talashkino is notable because in the end of the 19th and in the beginning of the 20th century it belonged to Princess Maria Tenisheva, who created here an artistic colony. The buildings of the estate are currently split between Talashkino and a nearby village, Flyonovo.

Tenisheva, sponsored by her husband, Vladimir Tenishev, bought the estate in 1893. She lived in Saint Petersburg, was educated as an artist, was acquainted with many contemporary artists, and since 1894 ran a free art studio in her house, supervised by Ilya Repin, the most influential Russian painter. She was also an art collector, and in 1898 she donated all of her collection to the Russian Museum. In 1900, she opened an artisan workshop, which mainly produced ceramics and carvings, and invited Sergey Malyutin to supervise it. The objective of Tenisheva was to create a "genuine Russian style". Apprentices, selected by Malyutin, were local peasants. Malyutin stayed in Talashkino until 1903, and in the meanwhile designed a house in Flyonovo based on Russian fairy tales. After 1903, the workshop was taken over by Alexey Zinovyev and Vladimir Beketov, who were both under influence of Nicholas Roerich. The production of the workshop was exhibited all over Russia on a regular basis; in 1902, there was a large exhibition of Talashkino products in Smolensk. Tenisheva also asked a photographer, Ivan Barshchevsky, to organize a historical museum in Talashkino, with the purpose of educating local peasants. The museum has proven to be too big and was in 1905 relocated to Smolensk. Tenisheva organized a theater and a balalaika orchestra (conducted by Vasily Lidin) in Talashkino as well. A number of Russian painters visited Tenisheva in Talashkino, including Ilya Repin, Konstantin Korovin, Mikhail Vrubel, and Nicolas Roerich.

In 1919, Tenisheva left Russia, and the estate was nationalized and decayed. Most of the buildings were lost; those which survived currently belong to the Smolensk Museum. The Church of the Holy Spirit has mosaic decoration made by Nicholas Roerich.
