= Ostyor, Russia =

Rural locality in Roslavlsky District, Smolensk Oblast, Russia

Coordinates: 54°00′58″N 32°48′09″E

Ostyor (Russian: Остёр) is a rural locality (a selo) in Roslavlsky District of Smolensk Oblast, Russia. Population: 1,945 (2002 census); 2,228 (1989 Soviet census).

Ostyor had a status of urban-type settlement until December 28, 2004, when it was demoted to a rural locality.

In August 1941, 300 Belarusian Jews arrived in Ostyor in order to extract peat. In September 1941, they were all murdered in a mass execution perpetrated by an Einsatzgruppen.

== Sources ==
- Администрация Смоленской области. Постановление №261 от 30 апреля 2008 г. «Об утверждении реестра административно-территориальных единиц и территориальных единиц Смоленской области», в ред. Постановления №464 от 27 июня 2014 г. «О внесении изменений в реестр административно-территориальных единиц и территориальных единиц Смоленской области». Опубликован: База данных "Консультант-плюс". (Administration of Smolensk Oblast. Resolution #261 of April 30, 2008 On the Adoption of the Registry of the Administrative-Territorial Units and Territorial Units of Smolensk Oblast, as amended by the Resolution #464 of June 27, 2014 On Amending the Registry of the Administrative-Territorial Units and Territorial Units of Smolensk Oblast. ).
