= Vorga =

Rural locality in Yershichsky District of Smolensk Oblast, Russia

Coordinates: 53°45′06″N 32°45′47″E

Vorga (Russian: Ворга) is a rural locality (a selo) in Yershichsky District of Smolensk Oblast, Russia. It lies 28 km south of the railway junction Roslavl. Population: 1,231 (2007 est.); 2,400 (1968). Postal code: 216571. Dialing code: +7 48155.

== History ==
A glassworks was built there in 1855.
