= Sneberka =

Rural locality in Monastyrshchinsky District, Smolensk Oblast, Russia

Coordinates: 54°23′21″N 32°05′10″E

Sneberka (Russian: Снеберка) is a rural locality (a village) in Monastyrshchinsky District of Smolensk Oblast, Russia, located 52 kilometers (32 mi) from the border with Belarus. Population: 14 (2007 est.). The area of the village is 0.36 square kilometers (0.14 sq mi).

During World War II, in July 1941, Sneberka was occupied by German troops. The Soviet army liberated the village in September 1943.

Pochinok railway station is close to the village.
