= Kadino, Smolensk Oblast =

Rural locality in Monastyrshchinsky District, Smolensk Oblast, Russia

Coordinates: 54°18′09″N 31°28′07″E

Kadino (Russian: Кадино) is a village in Monastyrshchinsky District of Smolensk Oblast, Russia, located on the right bank of the Gorodnya River. It had 204 inhabitants in 2007.

The name of the village originates from the time of Tatar-Mongolian sovereignty ("kadi" is Tatar for "judge").

During the Smolensk War of 1632–1634, the village was the scene of battles between the Russians and the Polish. During the Andrusov negotiations of 1666–1667, Kadino was the residence of Polish ambassadors.

Кadino was one of the local centers of the farmers' movement during the Revolution of 1905 Here, frequent anti-government meetings of peasants of adjacent villages were conducted, and illegal literature was promoted. On August 15, 1906, during a meeting, police unsuccessfully tried to arrest the organizer, А. Kharasev. On the following day, the police tracked him and he was arrested. When the police tried to take him away, an alarm sounded. Armed peasants from the neighboring villages attacked the police group, released the arrested, beat the chief of the guards, disarmed him, and threw him into the river. During the fight, two policemen were killed and a manager was wounded. The revolt was suppressed by the military from Mstislavl.

In October 1941, Nazi invaders massacred three hundred local residents, as the area was a hotbed of partisan activity. A monument stands in their memory. The village provides the namesake behind the Kadinsky surname.
