= Krasatinka, Krasninsky District, Smolensk Oblast =

Rural locality in Krasninsky District, Smolensk Oblast, Russia

Coordinates: 54°26′09″N 31°17′12″E

Krasatinka (Russian: Красатинка) is a rural locality (a village) in Krasninsky District of Smolensk Oblast, Russia. As of 2007, the population is four residents, in an area of 1.3 square kilometers (0.50 sq mi).

The telephone dialing code is +7 48145, the postal code is 216100, and the OKATO code is 66224865007.

== Geography ==
The village is located in the western part of Krasninsky District, 16 kilometers (9.9 mi) southwest of the district's administrative center of Krasny and 18 kilometers (11 mi) from the P-135 highway running Smolensk–Krasny–Gusino. The Gusino train station on the Moscow–Minsk line is 33 kilometers (21 mi) to the north.

== History ==
During World War II, the village was occupied by German troops in July 1941, and liberated in September 1943.
