= Ray, Smolensk Oblast =

Village in Smolensk Region, Russia

Coordinates: 54.7094°N 32.0072°E

Ray (Russian: Рай) is a village in Smolensk region of Russia. Located in the central part of region, 1.5 km to the south of the motorway A141[ru], and 6 km to the south-west of Smolensk.

Population – 132 residents (2007 year). Included in the Prigorskii rural settlement.

== History ==
South German knight Jacob von-der after entering the service of the Polish king Wladyslaw IV received land holdings in the Smolensk district, and then was added to the Polish nobility. Later he added his name to the nickname "Lyarsky". After 1654, (when Smolensk joined the Russian State) he went into the service of king, named Alexei Mikhailovich, retaining his possessions, he began to be called Vonlyarlyarski. Alexander Vasilievich Vonlyarlyarsky called his farmstead "Ray" (in translation into English – "Heaven"). Since 1813 homestead heavily built up, was built the house, the stone church, a park. Currently, from the estate preserved Kazan church and bell tower.
