= Master Apartments =

Residential skyscraper in Manhattan, New York

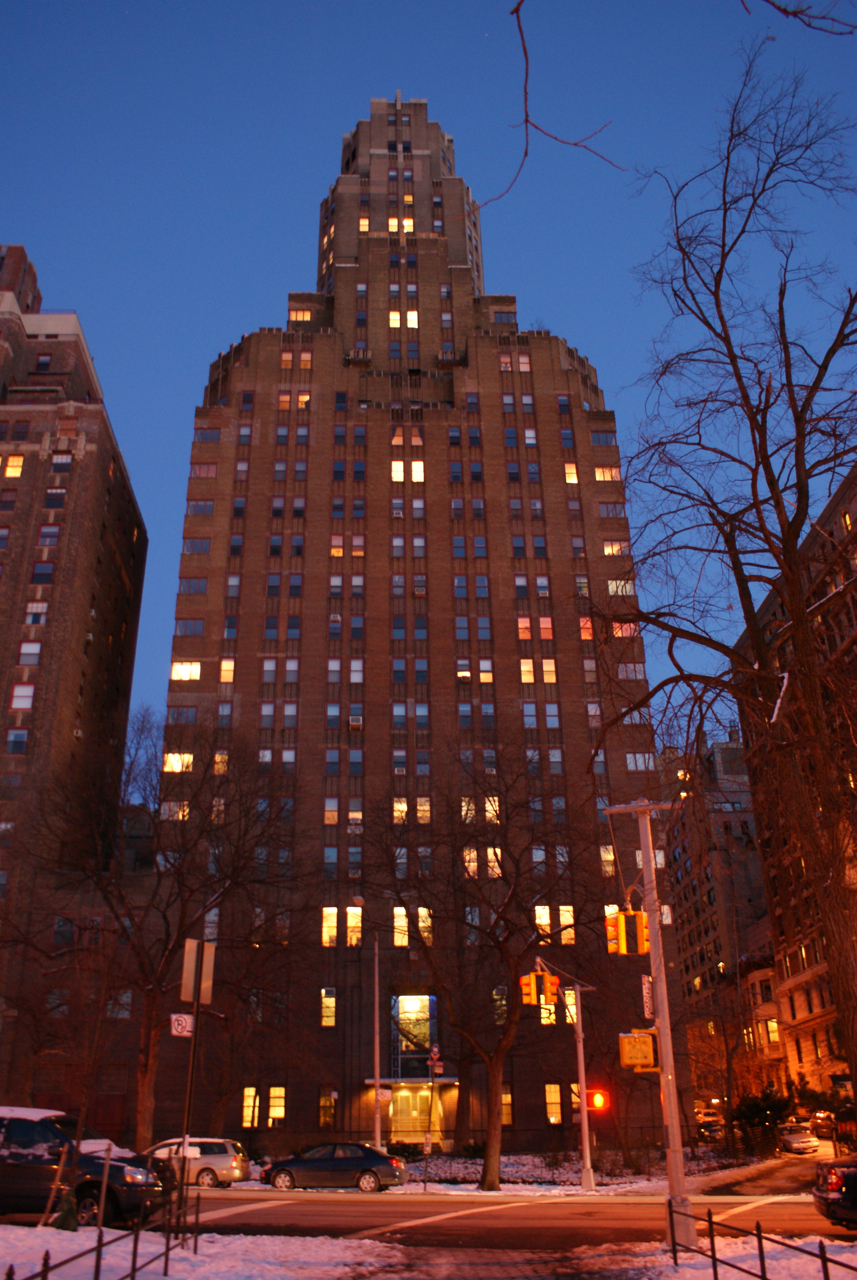
- Riverside Drive entrance
- Former names: Master Building

General information
- Type: Housing cooperative
- Architectural style: Art Deco
- Location: 310 Riverside Drive; Manhattan, New York 10025; United States
- Coordinates: 40.80050°N 73.97126°W
- Construction started: March 24, 1928
- Opened: October 17, 1929
- Cost: $1,925,000

Height
- Height: 443 ft (135 m)

Technical details
- Floor count: 29

Design and construction
- Architects: Harvey Wiley Corbett, Helmle, Corbett & Harrison; and Sugarman & Berger
- Master Building
- U.S. National Register of Historic Places
- New York State Register of Historic Places
- New York City Landmark
- NRHP reference No.: 16000036
- NYSRHP No.: 06101.017129
- NYCL No.: 1661

Significant dates
- Added to NRHP: February 23, 2016
- Designated NYSRHP: December 30, 2015
- Designated NYCL: December 5, 1989

The Master Apartments, officially known as the Master Building, is a 27-story Art Deco skyscraper at 310 Riverside Drive, on the Upper West Side of Manhattan in New York City, New York, US. It sits on the northeast corner of Riverside Drive and West 103rd Street. Designed by Harvey Wiley Corbett of the firm Helmle, Corbett & Harrison, in conjunction with Sugarman & Berger, the Master Apartments was completed in 1929 as the tallest building on Riverside Drive. It was the first skyscraper in New York City to feature corner windows and the first to employ brick in varying colors for its entire exterior.

The Master Apartments' name derives from the Master Institute of United Arts, an art institute founded in 1920 by Nicholas and Helena Roerich. Wealthy financier Louis L. Horch began purchasing lots in 1925 to build the apartment building, and in 1928 he secured a bond to fund its construction. As built, the building's lower floors consisted of a museum; a school for the fine and performing arts; and an international art center. The building opened in 1929 to generally positive acclaim, but it went into foreclosure in 1932, and Horch's tax-exempt corporation acted as the Master Building's receiver from 1934 to 1935. Following a disagreement between Horch and the Roeriches, the museum was closed and the Roeriches unsuccessfully sued to regain control of the Master Apartments. Louis Horch's wife Nettie also controlled some aspects of the building and its organizations during this time, but by 1958, the Horches' son Frank became the building's manager.

During the 1950s and 1960s, people moved out of the surrounding Manhattan Valley neighborhood. Consequently, the Master Apartments' museum and cultural center closed by 1971, their holdings dispersed elsewhere, although the building's auditorium was still used for cultural events. After Louis's death in 1979, the building was bought by real estate investor Sol Goldman, who converted it to a housing co-operative over the next decade. Further renovations, which were completed in 2005, resulted in many of the one-bedroom studios being combined into two- and three-bedroom units. These renovations attracted more families and made the building more luxurious by both quality-of-life and purchase-price measures. The Master Apartments was listed on the National Register of Historic Places in 2016.

== Site ==
The Master Building is at 310 Riverside Drive on the Upper West Side of Manhattan in New York City, New York, US. The building occupies the northeastern corner of Riverside Drive and 103rd Street, across from Riverside Park. It is situated on a nearly square land lot with an area of 13,518 square feet (1,255.9 m^{2}). The lot has a frontage of 115 feet (35 m) along Riverside Drive and 120 feet (37 m) along 103rd Street, with an indentation in the northeast corner. The building is part of the Riverside-West End Historic District, which became a New York City designated landmark in 2015. The buildings of the Riverside–West 105th Street Historic District are located one block north. The surrounding neighborhood largely contains brick-and-limestone row houses and apartment structures built in the 19th and early 20th centuries.

== Architecture ==
The Master Building was designed by Harvey Wiley Corbett of the firm Helmle, Corbett & Harrison, in conjunction with the firm Sugarman & Berger. The building was developed for artist Nicholas Roerich and his financial patron, Louis L. Horch. The skyscraper's first three floors originally held a museum, a school of the fine and performing arts, and an international art center, operated by Roerich and his wife Helena. (Note: They were the Roerich Museum, the Master Institute of United Arts, and the Corona Mundi International Center of Art.) Horch largely funded all three organizations.

=== Form and facade ===
The Master Building is 28 stories tall, though contemporary media referred to it as having 24 stories. The building is cited as being 443 feet (135 m) tall. According to the Master Building's first manager, only three other residential structures in New York City were taller: the Savoy-Plaza Hotel, the Park Central Hotel, and the Ritz Tower. Upon its completion in 1929, the Master Building was the tallest structure on Riverside Drive. It is still the avenue's tallest residential building, surpassed only by the Riverside Church on 120th Street.

The northern section of the building contains a three-story wing. The Master Building has a shallow setback above the second story on its eastern elevation, as well as above the three-story wing on its northern elevation. Above the 14th story, the building sets back further into an irregularly massed "transitional" section with several setbacks, which rises to the 21st story. The octagonal tower rises above the transitional building. The single pinnacle contrasts with the multiple twin-towered buildings on Central Park West (namely the Century, the Majestic, the San Remo, and the El Dorado), which were all built following a change to the zoning regulations in 1929.

The building has a brick exterior that was deep purple in its lower stories, originally tapering to white at the tower. Over the years, the pinnacle has weathered to a light gray color. Harvey Wiley Corbett said the coloration gave the skyscraper a "feeling of growth". He said: "This colored brick exterior, which rises from a low, dark ground to a gleaming, white pinnacle, gives the building a dynamic quality. The play of sunlight on the many hues will make the building a beautiful spectacle of changing colors." Other ornamentation was limited to brick patterns on the base and spandrel panels, as well as architectural terracotta on the parapets of each setback.

==== Base ====
The Master Building's two main entrances, at the centers of the 103rd Street and Riverside Drive elevations, both contain double-height portals. The 103rd Street entrance provides access to the residential lobby, with a pair of metal-and-glass doors directly in front of the sidewalk. The Riverside Drive entrance, which formerly led to the Roerich Museum, is approached by a short flight of steps and contains one metal-and-glass door on either of the portal's reveals. Both entrances have brick portals. which are laid in courses of headers A metal canopy is cantilevered in front of either entrance. Recessed within each portal are three-part transoms with sidelights made of blue leaded glass. Each sidelight consists of several small rectangular panes with metal motifs resembling corn stalks. The central pane of both portals had originally been made of blue glass, but these were replaced with clear glass at some point after they were vandalized.

Near the eastern end of the 103rd Street elevation is a third entrance, with three pairs of doors leading to the building's auditorium. Two sets of doors are made of paneled glass, while the remaining pair is a metal service door. Above each of these doors are patterned brick panels, composed of diagonally-oriented courses of headers. The central door is topped by a paneled-glass transom with blue leaded-glass sidelights, though there is no canopy in front of this door. A fourth entrance is at the northern end of the Riverside Drive elevation and formerly led to a restaurant. This doorway also has a tripartite transom, though the sidelights are made of metal. Originally, the transom had been made of blue glass, which also suffered vandalism and was replaced with metal.

The main entrance on Riverside Drive is flanked by three bays of windows; the innermost bay is separated from the two outer bays by projecting piers. The main entrance on 103rd Street is flanked by four bays; the inner three bays are separated from the outer bay by projecting piers. On both elevations, the first-story windows contain metal grilles in front of them. Below the first-story windows, the brickwork is laid in headers. The southwest corner of the first and second stories does not have windows, since the Roerich Museum was formerly housed there.

The cornerstone is at ground level, embedded into the building's southwest corner. It has an all-black irregular shape stepped like the building. On it are inscribed the year 1929 and a symbol designed by Roerich consisting of a circle enclosing three dots together with a monogram. The monogram, showing the letter R within the letter M, stands for the Roerich Museum. The circle and the three dots are the symbol of Roerich's Banner of Peace. He once said the circle represents eternity and unity and the dots the triune nature of existence. On another occasion he said the symbol has two meanings: in one interpretation, the circle represents the totality of culture and the dots are art, science, and religion (or philosophy), while in the other, the circle symbolizes the endlessness of time and the dots are the past, the present, and the future. The cornerstone contains a 400-year-old casket from the Rajput dynasty of northern India. Made of iron with inlays of gold and silver, the casket contains photographs taken during the Roeriches' expedition to Central Asia. It is also said to contain Jacob's Pillow or the Stone of Scone.

==== Upper stories ====
On the 3rd to 14th stories, the fenestration is composed of windows separated by wide and narrow piers. The corners of the building were outfitted with windows wrapping around the edge at a 90-degree angle. These were the first such windows in a skyscraper in New York City. (Note: The Landmarks Preservation Commission describes this as a fine distinction: the Child's Restaurant building at 604 Fifth Avenue in Midtown Manhattan (built 1925) was cited as the first building of any kind with such windows.) The corner windows were originally folding casement windows, though most of these have since been replaced by "Chicago-style windows". The rest of the facade is divided into bays, each with a single one-over-one sash window per floor. These windows were replaced in the 1970s and again in 1990.

The bays of the facade are generally grouped into pairs, except for the outermost bays of each elevation, which are grouped as single bays. Each different grouping of bays is separated by a wide pier, and the bays in each grouping are divided by a narrower pier. The spandrel panels between the windows on different stories are composed of dark and light bricks. The contrast between the bricks gives the appearance of four vertical lines in each spandrel panel.

The building's setbacks, which double as terraces for the apartments, begin above the 14th story. Each setback contains terracotta cresting; the color of the cresting varied based on how high up the terrace was. Some sections of terracotta cresting are gray, while other sections are yellow and orange.

=== Features ===
The building was to house a large and a small auditorium, two art libraries, conference rooms, and studios, in addition to three cultural institutions. These were all located on the first three floors. The building's steel superstructure was in the core, and the corners lacked columns, which were present in other buildings of the time.

==== Lower stories ====
The auditorium is used by a church as of 2016. It has 300 seats across an orchestra level and a balcony. The seats have red and purple upholstery, a color scheme repeated on the stage curtains. The stage itself wraps around to the left and right walls; it was enlarged at some point after the Master Building opened. The auditorium's balcony level has been modified several times over the years.

The 103rd Street lobby contains a lounge on the left (west) and a concierge desk to the right (east). The concierge desk dates to 1996 and contains a corn-stalk motif. The floors are made of terrazzo tiles with geometric patterns, while the walls contain a crown molding composed of 90-degree angles. On the north wall is a bank of three elevators; the elevators' aluminum doors contain geometric motifs, similar to those on the first-floor window grills. The elevator bank is separated from the rest of the lobby by a colonnade of four columns. Between each column, bronze-colored octagonal light fixtures hang from the ceiling.

The Riverside Drive lobby has a limestone floor and baseboards. The side walls contain two sets of double doors leading to commercial spaces. The center of the Riverside Drive lobby contains a grand limestone staircase, which leads to the second floor. A single flight rises from lobby level to an intermediate landing, where two upper flights run in the opposite direction from the lower flight. The balustrades of the staircase consist of angular limestone blocks, set at 90-degree angles. At the second story was the museum, which has since been divided by glass partitions and converted into offices.

==== Apartments ====
The upper stories contained an apartment hotel complying with New York City tenement laws. This was done because apartment hotels were not subject to tenement-law height restrictions. Conversely, units within apartment hotels could not have individual kitchens; instead, each unit had a "pantry" and the entire apartment hotel had an on-site restaurants and maid service. There were to be 390 apartments, with the majority having one bedroom and several having two or three bedrooms. The completed structure had 233 one-room, 63 two-room, and two three-room apartments as well as a penthouse suite of seven rooms. In total, the Master Building was to contain 406 rooms. After the Master Building was converted into a housing cooperative in the 1980s, many of the one-bedroom units were combined.

== History ==
Although "Master Building" is the name that appeared on official documents, the structure has long been known as Master Apartments or The Master. From 1939 onward newspaper advertising used both names constantly. One 1939 ad listed "The Master. Choice 1, 2 room suites, serving pantries, full hotel service, all rooms outside; from $50 month unfurnished; few furnished, $65 month. Popular price restaurant. Home of Riverside Museum. Concerts, lectures, recitals free to residents."

=== Development ===
Both the building and the institute take their name primarily from Master Morya, a non-corporeal spiritual leader from whom Helena Roerich received guidance via automatic writing. A secondary source of the name was Roerich himself who was revered as a theosophist master, able to interpret the wisdom of ancient gurus to modern man.

The Master Institute of United Arts came into being in 1920 as the Master School of United Arts. It struggled to survive until, in 1922, Louis Horch financed its transfer from a single-room, all-in-one studio at 314 West 54th Street to a mansion he bought on the site where the Master Building would later be constructed. Horch's wife, Nettie Horch, was a friend of Frances Grant who directed the Master School for the Roeriches. Nettie and Louis were patrons of the arts and ardent believers in art education as an indirect means of promoting harmony among the peoples of the world. They were attracted to the spiritual quest in which the Roeriches were engaged and participated in sessions during which Helena Roerich would receive instructions from Master Morya (or other esoteric beings) and Nicholas Roerich would record them on scrolls of paper that were later transcribed into a series of texts, the Leaves of Morya's Garden. Their teachings became the core of a spiritual and cultural movement known as Roerichism. (Note: Entry number 46, which follows, appears to encourage the construction of a building, such as the Master Building, as an educational center for spiritual enlightenment: Learn to approach Our Heights pure of heart. Our Ray will shine upon you and exalt your daily life. You carry stones for the raising of My new Temple. Teach others My Word, and wisdom will flourish; And a new Temple will be raised. Do not regard Me as a magician, yet can I lead you upward upon the ladder of Beauty beheld only in dreams. Wafting to you the fragrance from the mountains of Tibet, We bring the message of a new religion of the pure spirit to humanity. It is coming; and you, united here in search of light, bear the precious stone. To you is revealed the miracle of creating harmony in life. It will reveal to the world a new Teaching. — Leaves of Morya's Garden (self-published, New York, 1923))

The Master Institute aimed to give students a well-rounded education in the arts and also to "open the gates to spiritual enlightenment" through culture. The mansion where it was located also housed the Roerich Museum, containing many of the thousands of paintings Roerich had created, and Corona Mundi, which arranged for exhibitions of paintings by Roerich and international artists.

==== Preparation for construction ====
In 1925, while the Roeriches were engaged in a long period of travel in Central Asia, Horch began to acquire the lots surrounding the mansion to construct the Master Building. The Roeriches' extensive travels were almost entirely funded by Louis Horch. (Note: ROERICH v. HELVERING No. 7578. 115 F.2d 39 (1940), Commissioner of Internal Revenue. United States Court of Appeals for the District of Columbia. Decided September 3, 1940.) As is common when assembling adjacent lots for a single purpose, he used third-party proxies as purchasers. In doing this he followed a pattern he had established in providing an organizational structure for the Master Institute when he installed the Roeriches and their close associates as nominal shareholders and corporate officers.

In 1928, Horch formed a corporation, Master Building, Inc., in which he was president. The corporation was appointed to plan and construct a skyscraper to replace the mansion in which the museum, institute, and outreach center were located. The architect was Harvey Wiley Corbett, of the architectural firm Helmle, Corbett & Harrison. Plans filed in January 1928 called for a 24-story apartment hotel, topped by a stupa – a Buddhist shrine in the shape of a staggered pyramid with a spire on top. Subsequently, plans for the stupa were scrapped in favor of an additional three stories. (Note: The New York City Landmarks Preservation Commission report on the building states that the building is 29 stories high. The web site of Master Apartment, Inc. gives 28. However, all news accounts state that it has only 27 stories.) Helmle, Corbett & Harrison teamed with another architectural firm, Sugarman & Berger. Henry Sugarman, of the latter organization, advised in the building's design and supervised interior construction work. An article in the New York Times said the planned building was to be "New York's first skyscraper art gallery", while an art critic for the Washington Post called it "a shrine of art with a truly American architectural expression."

=== Construction ===
On June 15, 1928, Horch arranged for the American Bond and Mortgage Company to underwrite a bond of $1,925,000 to cover costs. The bonds, which were linked to the price of gold, were certificates held under a trust mortgage with the Chatham Phenix National Bank and Trust Company. (Note: The tombstone ad for the issue said it consisted of a 6% first mortgage of 12-year sinking fund bond certificates denoted "Series A." They were dated June 15, 1928, and were to mature on June 15, 1940. The certificates were secured by a first mortgage of $2,075,000 of which $150,000 was designated as Series "B" and was subordinate to the bond issue. The corporate trustee was Chatham Phenix National Bank and Trust Company.) Prospective purchasers of the bonds were told that Horch and an associate guaranteed payment of principal and interest personally and that the income from rentals was expected far to exceed expenses, including both interest costs and amounts to be committed to the sinking fund. (Note: The associate listed with Horch as guarantor, Maurice Lictmann, had little net worth and Horch himself was actually the only guarantor. The tombstone ad said the property on completion had been appraised at $2,900,000 and land valued at $610,000. The ad also said "The first three floors have been leased at an annual rental of $65,000 for 21 years. Net income estimated at $249,620 or over twice the heaviest annual interest requirements on this issue.") Also in June 1928, the Longacre Construction Company was given the general contract for the building's construction. The cornerstone was laid on March 24, 1929. Prominent politicians participated in the cornerstone-laying ceremony and among messages read from prominent Americans was a letter from Albert Einstein in which he praised the cultural goals of the building's directors.

The building was originally planned to cost $1.7 million (equivalent to $31,900,000 in 2025). Horch spent $2,497,164 for land and construction costs. He used $1,790,500 of the first mortgage bond issue, $64,500 of a second mortgage, and made up the rest from a loan he made. Some of the construction workers received awards for "superior craftsmanship" in April 1929, and additional workers were honored that August. The Master Building opened on October 17, 1929. Press reports emphasized the opportunity for people to rent apartments in a building devoted to the arts and drew attention to the rapid growth of the Institute's cultural ideal of united arts, over seven years, from being housed in a single classroom to moving to a skyscraper. However, many reports did not describe religious factors, with one source saying that "the institution had nothing to do with cults and only with culture."

=== Financial problems ===
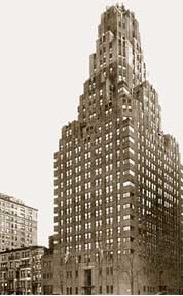
Master Building, 1929 view

The Wall Street Crash of 1929 occurred only weeks after the building was completed. At that time more than 80% of the apartments were rented and some 300 students had signed up to take classes at the Institute. However, both rentals and student fees were soon depleted, and the nonprofit corporation that ran the building was unable to meet its payments. On April 6, 1932, this organization was sued for nonpayment of taxes and sinking fund payments due on the mortgage bonds. At that time, it was alleged that the building was being mismanaged, the principal evidence offered being the provision of free living quarters to the Roeriches and their followers. Horch successfully contested the suit, partly on a technicality (Note: The suit was mistakenly taken in a Bronx court rather than one in Manhattan.) and partly by explaining that the 20 rooms occupied rent-free were used by management as partial compensation to employees of the corporation.

Representatives of the bondholders had argued that the parts of the building that did not produce rental income—that is, the museum, institute, and other cultural spaces—should be converted to apartments, but Horch successfully countered that the cultural spaces were an asset that generated a substantial tax exemption and that, in normal times, they led to higher rental rates from the existing apartments than would comparable apartments. He also pointed out that the demanded conversion would be expensive (about $100,000). In June 1932, the foreclosure case ended, with Horch being named one of two receivers tasked with clearing the building's debts.

In 1934, Horch arranged to have Master Institute of United Arts, Inc., the educational corporation he had created in 1923, take over responsibility for the building from the organization he had previously used to run it. (Note: Master Institute of United Arts, Inc. had as its (nominally participating) officers the same people who were officers of the museum.) He did this because the Institute was free of debt and, due to its status as an educational organization, was tax-exempt. In 1935, the receivership ended and control over the Master Building and the cultural organizations it contained was turned over to the Master Institute of United Arts, Inc. with Horch as its president. At this time, Horch arranged for the Institute to give a five-year mortgage for $1,674,800 to the entity that managed the building (now organized as the Riverside Drive & 103d Street Corporation) at five and one-half percent interest.

Horch, who had remained a devoted follower of the Roeriches since his acceptance of their spiritual quest as his own in 1923, started to fall out with them, for unclear reasons. The Roeriches maintained that Horch's motives were base: through guile and deception, they said, he had taken control of the Master Building, closed the cultural institutions it contained, and severed them and their associates from everything connected with the building and its contents. Horch countered that the Roeriches had improperly attempted to countermand his decisions as building owner and director of the cultural organizations it contained. He said they had shown bad faith when they asserted that they alone could receive and interpret the commands of the supreme being whom they all worshiped.

On June 8, 1935, he wrote Helena Roerich to say he feared that the Roeriches had lost confidence in himself and his wife Nettie. Then, on July 13, 1935, Nettie wrote Helena of her and Horch's "fourteen years of complete devotion in heart and in deed" and of their enduring "loyalty and selfless sacrifice" over that period. She reaffirmed their "flaming devotion" which they continued to hold in their hearts. And she said the Roeriches' attempt to exert unilateral control over their affairs had caused them to "contemplate, review and think of matters in a new light." These letters explain actions that Horch took on June 5, 1936, to sever relations between the Institute and the other cultural organizations housed at the Master Building and discharge all their employees. The employees who occupied rent-free apartments were told to vacate immediately.

In February 1936, the Roeriches and their associates attempted to obtain an injunction to prevent these actions. When the attempt failed, they sued Horch to regain what they believed to be their rightful authority to participate in the operation of the building and its component organizations. The latter case was settled on February 9, 1938, in favor of Horch. George Frankenthaler, the referee who decided the case, found that the Roeriches never possessed the authority they claimed. Horch alone administered the corporation that had the building constructed, ran the organizations that it housed, and obtained all the needed financing. In addition, he donated more than a million dollars of his own money, while the Roeriches and their associates had contributed no funds at all. Regarding allegations of deception, he found Horch to be the more creditable witness. (Note: George Frankenthaler (1886–1968) was a justice of the Supreme Court of New York State. He was the brother of justice Alfred Frankenthaler of the same court (and thus uncle of the abstract expressionist painter Helen Frankenthaler.)

=== Riverside Museum ===
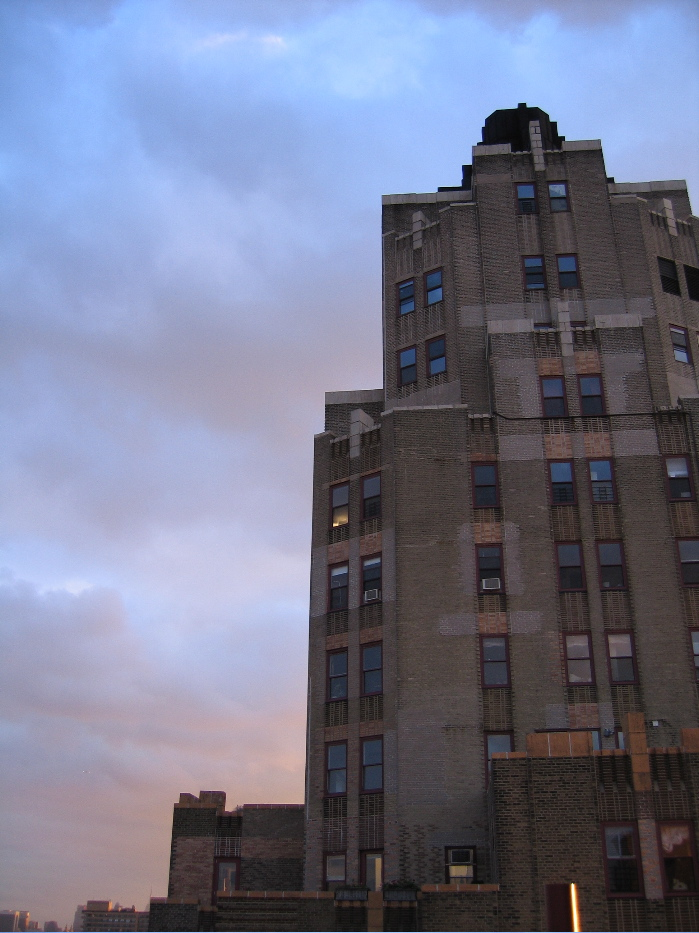
In 2004

Not long afterwards, Horch closed the Roerich Museum, which subsequently moved to a new location at 319 West 107th Street in 1949. In the Roerich Museum's former space, Horch established the Riverside Museum. He became president of the new museum and appointed Vernon C. Porter as its director. Open to the public free of charge, the new museum was devoted mainly to exhibitions of contemporary art by American artists. At its opening in on June 4, 1938, the museum showed modern American paintings and work by Native Americans as well as Tibetan art objects that Roerich had given to Horch. The American artists included Stuart Davis, Yasuo Kuniyoshi, Jack Levine, Marsden Hartley, George Luks, John Sloan, Philip Evergood, Reginald Marsh, Charles Burchfield, and Rockwell Kent.

In 1939 the museum began hosting the annual exhibitions of American Abstract Artists, a group devoted to expanding appreciation of non-objective art that had been formed in 1937. The show included more than 300 oils, watercolors, pastels, collages, drawings, constructions, and sculpture. That year it also began hosting exhibitions held by the New York Society of Women Artists, a group that had been founded in 1926 to promote the work of avant-garde women artists. Other 1939 shows included contemporary works by artists from Poland, (Note: These are said to be the last group of paintings to leave Poland before it was devastated by Nazi Germany and the Stalinist USSR.) documentary photographs of child laborers by Lewis Hine, an international exhibition of works by women artists, and a large display of Pan-American art.

Over the next few decades, the museum would specialize in exhibitions by members of artists' groups. In addition to the two already named, these included the Silvermine Guild of Artists (a Connecticut summer art colony), the Manhattan Camera Club, the Photo-Engravers' Art Society, the Brooklyn Society of Artists, the Artists Equity Group, and USCO (a collective from the Woodstock, New York art colony and Garnerville, New York). (Note: This list comes from contemporary reports in New York newspapers.) The museum was organized as a unit of the Master Institute of United Arts. As it had previously done, the institute gave art classes, provided studio space, and sponsored lectures, concerts, poetry readings, art clinics, and other cultural events.

Porter served as the museum's director through the 1940s. He was succeeded by Nettie Horch, who had been in charge of the Institute's cultural events since the building opened. She was assisted by her daughter, Oriole, who took over direction of the museum and cultural events in the late 1960s.

==== Role of Nettie Horch ====
In addition to running the museum, Nettie had a large role in running the Master Building as a whole; however, the exact division of responsibilities between Nettie and her husband is unclear. She was secretary of the corporation, although this may have been a nominal position as Louis and his lawyer prepared most of the corporation's correspondence and its filings. She also probably helped her husband decide to provide more than one million dollars toward achieving the Roeriches' spiritual and cultural ambitions. She met with the Roeriches and their other supporters in making plans for the Roerich Museum, Master Institute, Corona Mundi, and the other organizations housed in the Master Building. She was active as president of the Roerich Society and, after its demise, directed the Riverside Museum for many years. (Note: From 1937 to 1954 Nettie Horch was also fine arts chairman of the National Council of Women of the United States.)

=== Decline ===
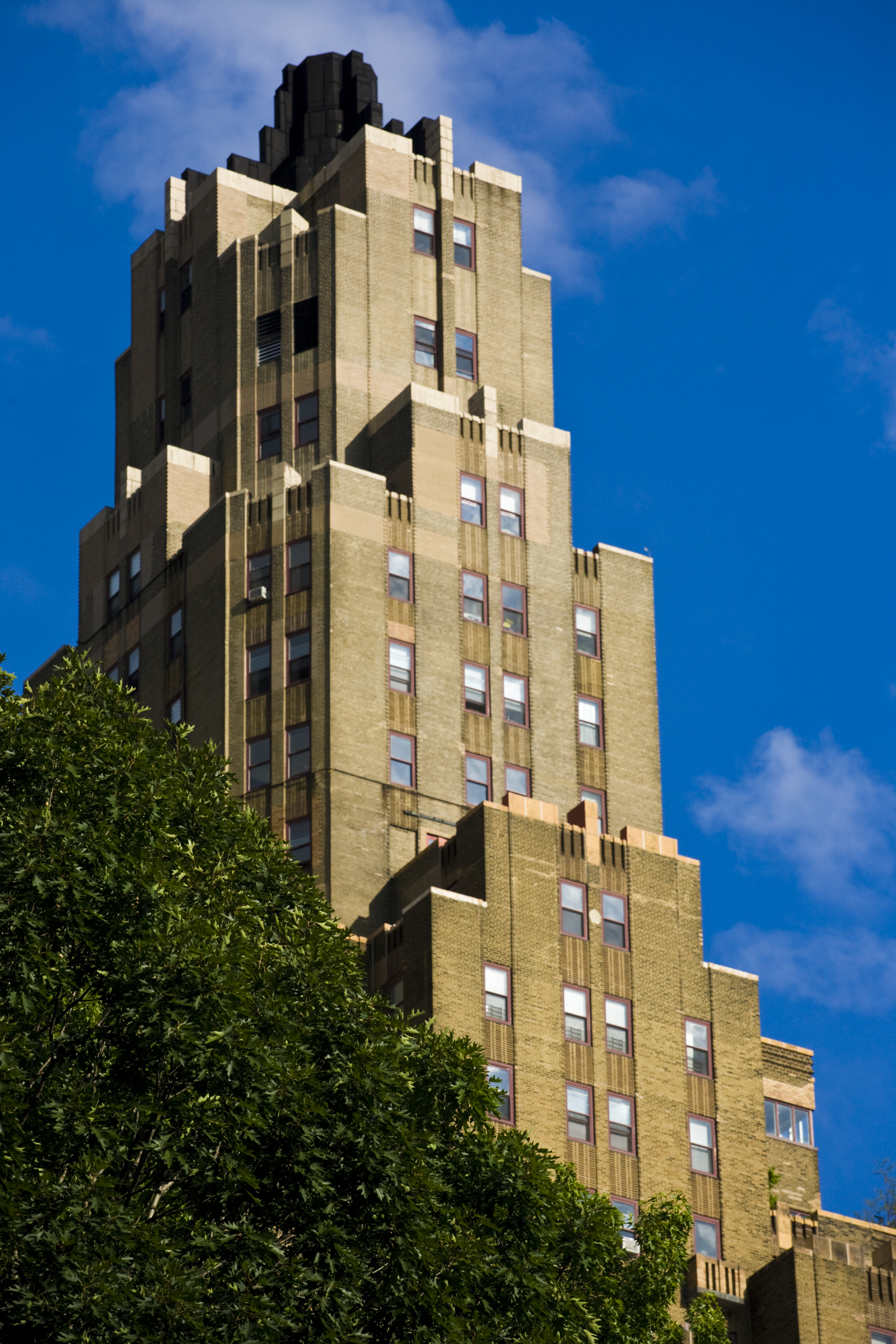
In 2008

In 1958, Louis Horch made his son Frank manager of the building. During the 1950s and 1960s, the Manhattan Valley neighborhood (then known as Bloomingdale), where the Master Building is located, saw its culturally-oriented middle class renters depart. Many of them may have bought houses in the city's suburbs. As a consequence, the Riverside Museum and cultural center lost their audience, and in 1971 they were forced to close. (Note: See also: History of New York City (1978–present) and 1975 New York City fiscal crisis.) The artwork holdings were donated to Brandeis University in Waltham, Massachusetts (a suburb of Boston), and became a major addition to the collection of its Rose Art Museum, which had been founded in 1961. The Horches' daughter, Oriole Farb, became advisory consultant for the collection at Brandeis. Cultural initiatives such as the Master Institute Chorus (founded in 1960) either folded, or, as in the case of the chorus, became affiliated with other organizations such as the New Amsterdam Singers. The building's auditorium continued to present concerts, plays, readings, and lectures in the 1940s and into the 1950s. From 1961 through 1989 the Equity Library Theater leased it for productions showcasing the talents of New York actors.

As chair of Bloomington Conservation Project, Horch and the Master Institute of United Arts led an effort to improve deteriorated housing by converting single-family brownstone buildings into rent-subsidized apartments. In 1970–71, Louis transferred partial ownership of the building to Frank and Oriole, and Louis and Nettie Horch moved to Florida. Frank was murdered during a 1975 robbery. The Bloomingdale area did not return to prosperity until the late 1980s and early 1990s, when the city as a whole experienced an economic rebound. As high-paying white-collar employment in financial institutions and other service industries replaced long-departed blue-collar jobs in the industrial sector, real estate speculators found that they could profit from new condos and co-ops either by replacing old buildings or by renovating them.

=== Co-op conversion and renovations ===
Following the death of Louis in 1979, the Horch family sold the Master Building to a real estate investor, Sol Goldman, who was then the city's largest private landlord. Goldman continued to operate the building as rental apartments until 1982 when he formed a company, Manhattan Master Apartment Associates, to convert it to a housing cooperative. The conversion was completed in 1988 when that company transferred control to a new organization, Master Apartments, Inc. At that time it was described as having 335 apartments on 28 floors served by four elevators. Buyers were permitted to finance up to 90% of the purchase price and 28% of the monthly maintenance fee was tax deductible.

In 1988, the New York City Landmarks Preservation Commission (LPC) began considering whether to designate the Master Building as a city landmark. The building was designated as such on December 10, 1989. The following year, the LPC approved the installation of new aluminum windows with baked-enamel finishes, which resembled the design of the previous windows. The firm of Antonucci and Lawless conducted further renovations in 1996, adding wheelchair-accessible doors at the 103rd Street entrance and restoring the first-floor iron grilles. In addition, the elevator doors in the lobby were renovated, and a new front desk was installed. The terracotta and brickwork on the facade was restored in 2004, and the auditorium doors were replaced in 2009.

After renovations were finished in 2005, the number of two- and three-bedroom units was increased dramatically, due to the combination of the building's original studio apartments. The larger layouts attracted more families to the cooperative community. In the early 21st century, the lobby has been restored, hallways remodeled, and amenities increased, including larger storage areas, a bike room, and an improved laundry facility. During that time, the auditorium continued to host lectures about art, architecture, urban planning, archaeology, history, and travel. The lobby was also used as an art gallery. Further work on the facade was completed in 2012, and the Master Apartments was listed on the National Register of Historic Places in 2016.

== Critical reception ==
The Landmarks Preservation Commission report on the building praises its "successful employment of sculptural massing, vertical emphasis, and the minimal, yet elegant, use of surface ornamentation and historically-inspired detailing." Critics have praised the adept handling of the transitions between the base and tower, "as square and chamfered corners established a sprightly syncopation against the more thunderous beat of the central masses."

== See also ==
- Art Deco architecture of New York City
- List of New York City Designated Landmarks in Manhattan from 59th to 110th Streets
- National Register of Historic Places listings in Manhattan from 59th to 110th Streets
