= Hidary =

Hidary is a surname. Notable people with the surname include:

- Jack Hidary (born 1967/68), American businessman
- Murray Hidary (born 1971), American businessman

== See also ==
- Hilary (name)
