= Electoral history of Bill de Blasio =

Elections featuring Mayor of New York City

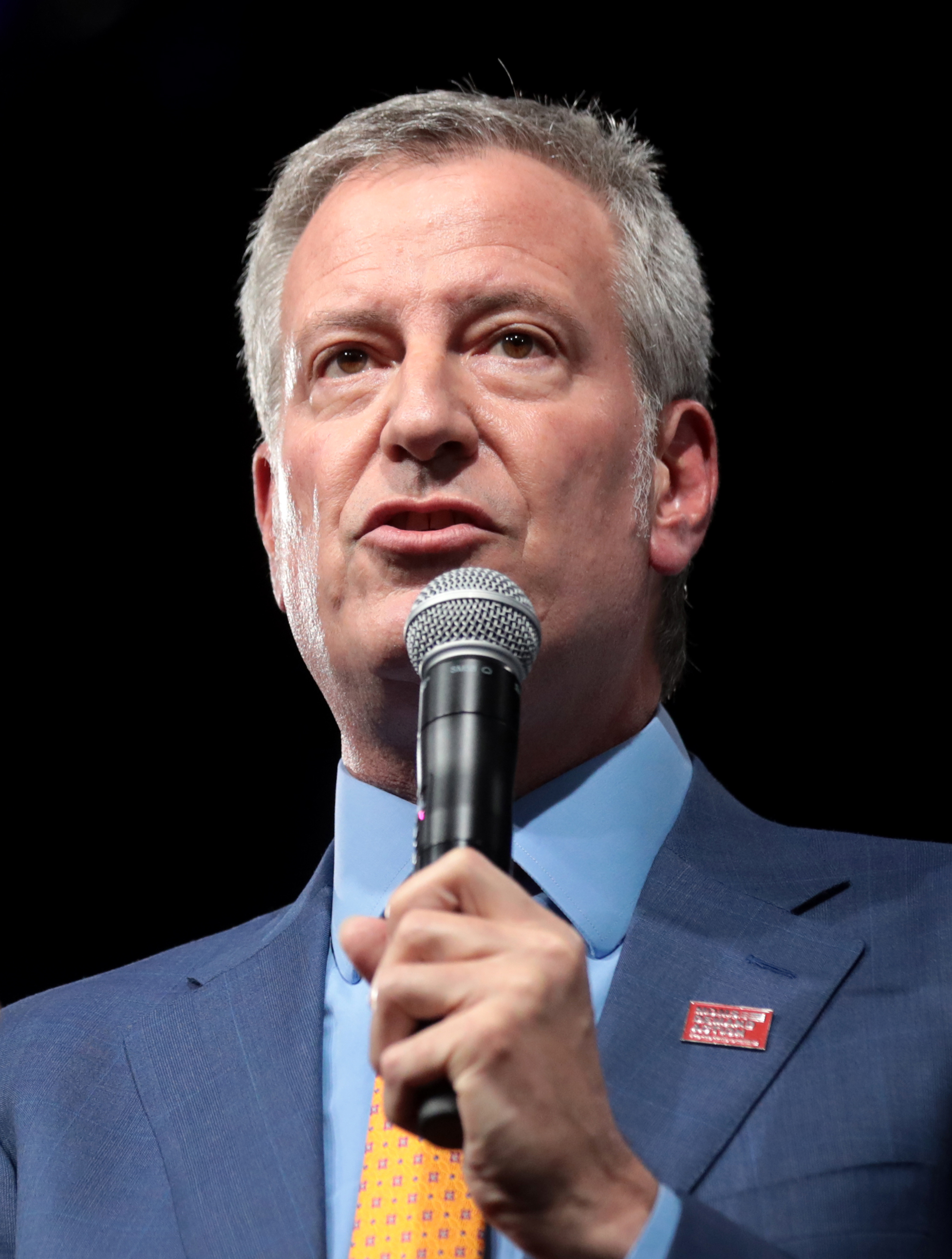
Bill de Blasio speaking at an event in Des Moines, Iowa.

This is the electoral history of Bill de Blasio, the 109th Mayor of New York City, in office from 2014 to 2022. Previously, he represented the 39th district in Brooklyn in the New York City Council from 2002 to 2009 and served as the 3rd Public Advocate of New York City from 2010 to 2013. He briefly ran for the Democratic presidential nomination in the 2020 United States presidential election.

== New York City Council elections ==
=== 2001 ===
Democratic primary for the 2001 New York City Council's 39th district election
Party	Candidate	Votes	%
Democratic	Bill de Blasio	5,161	32.12%
Democratic	Steven R. Banks	3,529	21.96%
Democratic	John W. Carroll	2,955	18.39%
Democratic	Anthony J. Pugliese	2,182	13.58%
Democratic	Paul Bader	1,439	8.96%
Democratic	Craig Hammerman	803	5.00%
Total votes		16,069	100.00

2001 New York City Council's 39th district general election
Party	Candidate	Votes	%
Democratic	Bill de Blasio	18,131	71.04%
Republican	Robert A. Bell	4,299	16.84%
Green	Gloria Mattera	2,563	10.04%
Conservative	Edward F. Clancy	528	2.07%
Total votes		25,521	100.00
Democratic hold			

=== 2003 ===
2003 New York City Council's 39th district general election
Party	Candidate	Votes	%
Democratic	Bill de Blasio	6,763	51.50
Working Families	Bill de Blasio	2,698	20.55
Total	Bill de Blasio (incumbent)	9,461	72.04%
Green	Gloria Mattera	2,484	18.91%
Republican	Luke Vander Linden	924	7.04%
Conservative	Luke Vander Linden	263	2.00%
Total	Luke Vander Linden	1,187	9.04%
Total votes		13,132	100.00
Democratic hold			

=== 2005 ===
2005 New York City Council's 39th district general election
Party	Candidate	Votes	%
Democratic	Bill de Blasio (incumbent)	17,554	83.44%
Republican	Yvette Velazquez-Bennett	2,933	13.94%
Conservative	Yvette Velazquez-Bennett	548	2.61%
Total	Yvette Velazquez-Bennett	3,481	16.55%
Total votes		21,035	100.00
Democratic hold			

== New York City Public Advocate elections ==
=== 2009 ===
Democratic primary for the 2009 New York City Public Advocate election
Party	Candidate	Votes	%
Democratic	Bill de Blasio	119,467	32.56%
Democratic	Mark Green	115,508	31.48%
Democratic	Eric Gioia	68,859	18.22%
Democratic	Norman Siegel	52,220	14.23%
Democratic	Imbiaz S. Syed	12,820	3.49%
Total votes		366,874	100.00

As no Democratic candidate reached 40%, a runoff election between the leading two candidates (de Blasio and Green) was required.

Democratic primary run-off for the 2009 New York City Public Advocate election
Party	Candidate	Votes	%
Democratic	Bill de Blasio	145,413	62.35%
Democratic	Mark Green	87,793	37.65%
Total votes		233,206	100.00

2009 New York City Public Advocate general election
Party	Candidate	Votes	%
Democratic	Bill de Blasio	679,366	72.72
Working Families	Bill de Blasio	45,263	4.84
Total	Bill de Blasio	724,629	77.56%
Republican	Alex Zablocki	164,090	17.56%
Conservative	William Lee	32,276	3.46%
Socialist Workers	Maura DeLuca	8,305	0.89%
Libertarian	Jim Lesczynski	4,808	0.52%
Total votes		934,108	100.00
Democratic hold			

== New York City mayoral elections ==
=== 2013 ===
Democratic primary for the 2013 New York City mayoral election
Party	Candidate	Votes	%
Democratic	Bill de Blasio	282,344	40.81%
Democratic	Bill Thompson	180,841	26.14%
Democratic	Christine Quinn	108,893	15.74%
Democratic	John Liu	47,286	6.84%
Democratic	Anthony Weiner	34,192	4.94%
Democratic	Erick Salgado	15,914	2.30%
Democratic	Randy Credico	11,530	1.67%
Democratic	Sal Albanese	5,843	0.84%
Democratic	Neil Grimaldi	4,677	0.68%
Total votes		691,520	100.00

2013 New York City mayoral general election
Party	Candidate	Votes	%
Democratic	Bill de Blasio	753,039	69.23
Working Families	Bill de Blasio	42,640	3.92
Total	Bill de Blasio	795,679	73.15%
Republican	Joe Lhota	236,212	21.72%
Conservative	Joe Lhota	24,888	2.29%
Taxes 2 High	Joe Lhota	2,500	0.23%
Students First	Joe Lhota	820	0.08%
Total	Joe Lhota	264,420	24.31%
Independence	Adolfo Carrion	8,675	0.80%
Green	Anthony Gronowicz	4,983	0.46%
Jobs & Education	Jack Hidary	2,922	0.27%
Common Sense	Jack Hidary	718	0.07%
Total	Jack Hidary	3,640	0.33%
Rent Is Too Damn High Party	Jimmy McMillan	1,990	0.18%
School Choice	Erick Salgado	1,946	0.18%
Libertarian	Michael Sanchez	1,746	0.16%
Socialist Workers	Dan Fein	758	0.07%
Tax Wall Street	Randy Credico	690	0.06%
Freedom Party	Michael K. Greys	575	0.05%
Reform	Carl Person	306	0.03%
Affordable Tomorrow	Joseph Melaragno	289	0.03%
War Veterans	Sam Sloan	166	0.02%
Flourish Every Person	Michael J. Dilger	55	0.01%
Write-in		1,318	0.12%
Total votes		1,087,710	100.00
Democratic gain from Independent			

=== 2017 ===
Democratic primary for the 2017 New York City mayoral election
Party	Candidate	Votes	%
Democratic	Bill de Blasio (incumbent)	343,054	74.00%
Democratic	Sal Albanese	70,521	15.21%
Democratic	Michael Tolkin	21,771	4.70%
Democratic	Robert Gangi	14,321	3.09%
Democratic	Richard S. Bashner	11,296	2.44%
Write-in		2,606	0.56%
Total votes		463,569	100.00%

Reform Party primary for the 2017 New York City mayoral election
Party	Candidate	Votes	%
Reform	Sal Albanese	3,937	59.02%
Reform	Bill de Blasio (incumbent)	1,148	17.21%
Reform	Nicole Malliotakis	452	6.78%
Reform	Bo Dietl	108	1.62%
Write-in		1,026	15.38%
Total votes		6,671	100.00%

2017 New York City mayoral general election
Party	Candidate	Votes	%
Democratic	Bill de Blasio	713,634	62.28
Working Families	Bill de Blasio	46,478	4.06
Total	Bill de Blasio (incumbent)	760,112	66.17%
Republican	Nicole Malliotakis	274,423	23.95%
Conservative	Nicole Malliotakis	37,197	3.25%
Stop de Blasio	Nicole Malliotakis	5,327	0.46%
Total	Nicole Malliotakis	316,947	27.59%
Reform	Sal Albanese	24,484	2.13%
Green	Akeem Browder	16,536	1.44%
Small Cities Party	Michael Tolkin	11,309	0.99%
Independent	Bo Dietl	11,163	0.97%
Libertarian	Aaron Commey	2,770	0.24%
Write-in		5,343	0.47%
Total votes		1,145,894	100.00%
Democratic hold			
