= New Amsterdam Singers =

Avocational chorus based in New York City

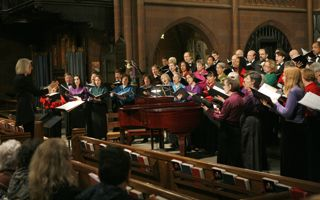
New Amsterdam Singers in concert in 2008

New Amsterdam Singers is an avocational chorus based in New York City which specializes in a cappella and double chorus repertoire and regularly performs contemporary and commissioned works.

Clara Longstreth served as music director of the chorus from 1968 until 2025. Ben Arendsen started as the music director in the fall of 2025.

== History ==
New Amsterdam Singers formed in 1971 from the remains of the Master Institute Chorus. Associated with the Bloomingdale House of Music from 1972 to 1978, the chorus became independent in 1978 and operates as a 501(c)(3) non-profit organization under the management of an elected board of directors. Noted for its "adventurous" programming and "handsome" performances, the chorus presents three subscriptions concerts per season at venues such as Merkin Hall, Holy Trinity Lutheran Church, Immanuel Lutheran Church and St. Peter's Church at Citicorp. The chorus rehearses at Broadway Presbyterian Church on the upper west side of Manhattan.

In addition to performing lesser-known works by major composers, the chorus has commissioned works by Paul Alan Levi (2011, 2002, 1994), Ronald Perera (2008, 1999), Behzad Ranjbaran (1999), Thomas Beveridge (1987) and Frances Heilbut (1974) and has premiered works by Kirke Mechem, Abbie Betinis, Alex Weiser, Charles Fussell, Matthew Harris, Daniel Pinkham, Michael Dellaira, and Mark Kilstofte, among others.

== Collaborations ==
The chorus has performed under the batons of Everett Lee (1976), Leonard Bernstein (1984), Newell Jenkins (1986) and Marin Alsop (1998) and has collaborated with diverse amateur and professional arts organizations including:

Broadway Bach Ensemble (2010)
Nimbus Dance Works (2009)
Lark Quartet (2008)
Matt Haimovitz (2007)
Park Avenue Chamber Symphony (2005,2016)
Mannes College Orchestra (2000)
Anonymous Four (1998)
José Limon Dance Company (1997)

== International tours ==
The chorus has toured regularly since 1985, performing in major halls and cathedrals in Greece, Spain, Poland, Portugal, England, Ireland, France, Turkey, Sweden, Italy, Russia, Latvia, Estonia, Argentina, Uruguay, Greece, Iceland, Denmark, and Bulgaria. In the summer of 2010, the chorus presented a series of concerts in Cuba, and in 2013, performed as part of a choral festival in South Africa.

== Recordings ==
The chorus has made 2 original recordings, American Journey: Poetry and Song in the Twentieth Century (1993) and (2003), and released a 2-disc 40th Anniversary Collection of its best performances in 2008.
