= Sunset Corner =

Acrylic painting by Helen Frankenthaler

Sunset Corner is a 1969 acrylic painting by American artist Helen Frankenthaler. The University of Michigan Museum of Art purchased it in 1973.

In 2018, it was loaned to the Williams College Museum of Art for an exhibition called "Topographies of Color." William Jaeger, writing for the Times Union, called the piece "a large, extraordinary work. . . dominated by a huge cascade of wan brick brown as it flows toward the bottom where other indistinct forms layer and grow in concentration to a kind of horizon. Your eyes want to linger in these last hard horizontal swaths, but you end up returning upward to the translucent dim 'sky' because it is so vast."

From 2018 to 2020, it has been on display at the University of Michigan Museum of Art for all three parts of a series of exhibitions called Abstraction, Color, and Politics, curated by museum director Christina Olsen.

== Background ==
Frankenthaler was active in the Color Field movement, and Sunset Corner features highly saturated blocks and swathes of shades of orange and gold. Frankenthaler painted it using her "soak-stain" method.

== Influence ==
Linda Gregerson's poem "Bleedthrough" (published in 1996) is inspired by this painting. Karl Kirchwey writes, "What is described is the effect of looking at the world through closed eyelids; in bright light, this results in just the blood-tinged wash that Frankenthaler's painting depicts." Another writer, for the Michigan Daily, noted its possible representation of menstrual blood.
