= Jan Schreiber =

American poet

Jan Schreiber (born 1941) is an American poet, translator, and literary critic who has been part of the renascence of formal poetry that began in the late twentieth century. He is the author of five books of verse, two books of verse translation and two books of literary criticism. He was a co-founder of the literary magazine, Canto: Review of the Arts, which flourished in the 1970s, and as a literary editor he launched the poetry chapbook series at the Godine Press. He is a recipient of the Carey Thomas Award for creative publishing.

Born in Wisconsin, Schreiber attended Stanford University, where he received his BA, then earned an MA at the University of Toronto and a PhD at Brandeis University where he studied with the poet J.V. Cunningham. Although he taught for brief periods at Tufts University and Lowell Technological Institute (now the University of Massachusetts Lowell), he spent most of his career as a researcher in the social sciences (founding the Social Science Research Institute) and a software entrepreneur (founding MicroSolve Corporation).

As a poet, Schreiber has written mainly in traditional forms. Though most of his verse consists of short lyric poems, he is also known for sharp, satirical epigrams of the kind commonly associated with Cunningham, and he has produced a few longer works extending to some 150 lines.

Beginning in 2004 Schreiber began writing for the on-line journal Contemporary Poetry Review, for which he produced numerous critical articles, some on individual poets, some on influential critics and scholars, and some on the development of the poetic canon. Many of these essays later appeared in his books Sparring with the Sun and Breath Lines.

Examples of his work as a poet appear in the on-line anthologies The Hypertexts and Poem Tree and in Lay Bare the Canvas, an anthology of ekphrastic poems. Seven of his poems were set to music by Paul Alan Levi in a song cycle for tenor and piano called Zeno's Arrow, which has been performed in Massachusetts and New York.

Since 2010 Schreiber has been closely involved in The Critical Path, a symposium on poetry criticism, which he co-founded with David J. Rothman. Originally held annually at Western Colorado University as part of its Writing the Rockies literary conference, the symposium adopted a virtual format in 2020 and now includes international participants.

In 2015 Schreiber was named Poet Laureate for the town of Brookline, Massachusetts. He serves as advisory editor for Think, a magazine of poetry, fiction, and essays.

== Criticism ==
Sparring With the Sun: Poets and the Ways We Think about Poetry in the Late Days of Modernism, Champaign, Ill.: Antilever Press, 2013

Breath Lines: How Poems Work and Why They Matter, Baton Rouge, La.: Louisiana State University Press, 2025

== Poetry ==
Digressions, Toronto: Aliquando Press, 1970

Wily Apparitions, Omaha: Cummington Press, 1992

Bell Buoys, Toronto: Aliquando Press, 1998

Peccadilloes, Hemet, California: White Violet Press, 2014

Bay Leaves, American Fork, Utah: Kelsay Books, 2019

== Translations ==
A Stroke upon the Sea (translations of poems by Walther von der Vogelweide), Aliquando Press, 1982

Sketch of a Serpent (translations of poems by Paul Valéry), Robert Barth, 1986

The Poems of Paul Valéry (translations of the complete poems by Paul Valéry, with an introduction and afterword), Cambridge Scholars, 2021
