= Gloria Ross =

American artist and designer (1923–1998)

Gloria F. Ross
- Born: 1923; New York City, New York, United States
- Died: 1998 (aged 74–75); New York City, New York, United States
- Education: Mount Holyoke College
- Occupations: Designer, tapestry artist
- Known for: Contemporary tapestry collaborations with modern painters
- Spouse: Arthur Ross (m. 1946)
- Children: 3
- Parent(s): Alfred Frankenthaler; Martha Lowenstein Frankenthaler
- Relatives: Helen Frankenthaler (sister)

Gloria F. Ross (1923–1998) was an American designer who was born and died in New York City. She was well known as a tapestry artist who worked in close collaboration with painters and weavers to create contemporary wall hangings. Ross's work is held in the Minneapolis Institute of Art.

== Early life and education ==
Ross was the second daughter of Alfred Frankenthaler (1881–1940), a New York Supreme Court Justice, and Martha Lowenstein Frankenthaler (1895–1954). Her sister was the abstract painter Helen Frankenthaler (1928–2011).

In 1943 Ross graduated from Mount Holyoke College. Ross married Arthur Ross (1910–2007) in 1946 and had three children: Alfred (1946), Beverly (1948), and Clifford (1952). During the 1980s Ross was the first tapestry maker to translate into wool famous paintings, by such artists as Kenneth Noland, Robert Motherwell, Helen Frankenthaler, Frank Stella, Jean Dubuffet, Louise Nevelson, Jack Youngerman, Romare Bearden, and others.
