= Clifford Ross =

American artist (born 1952)

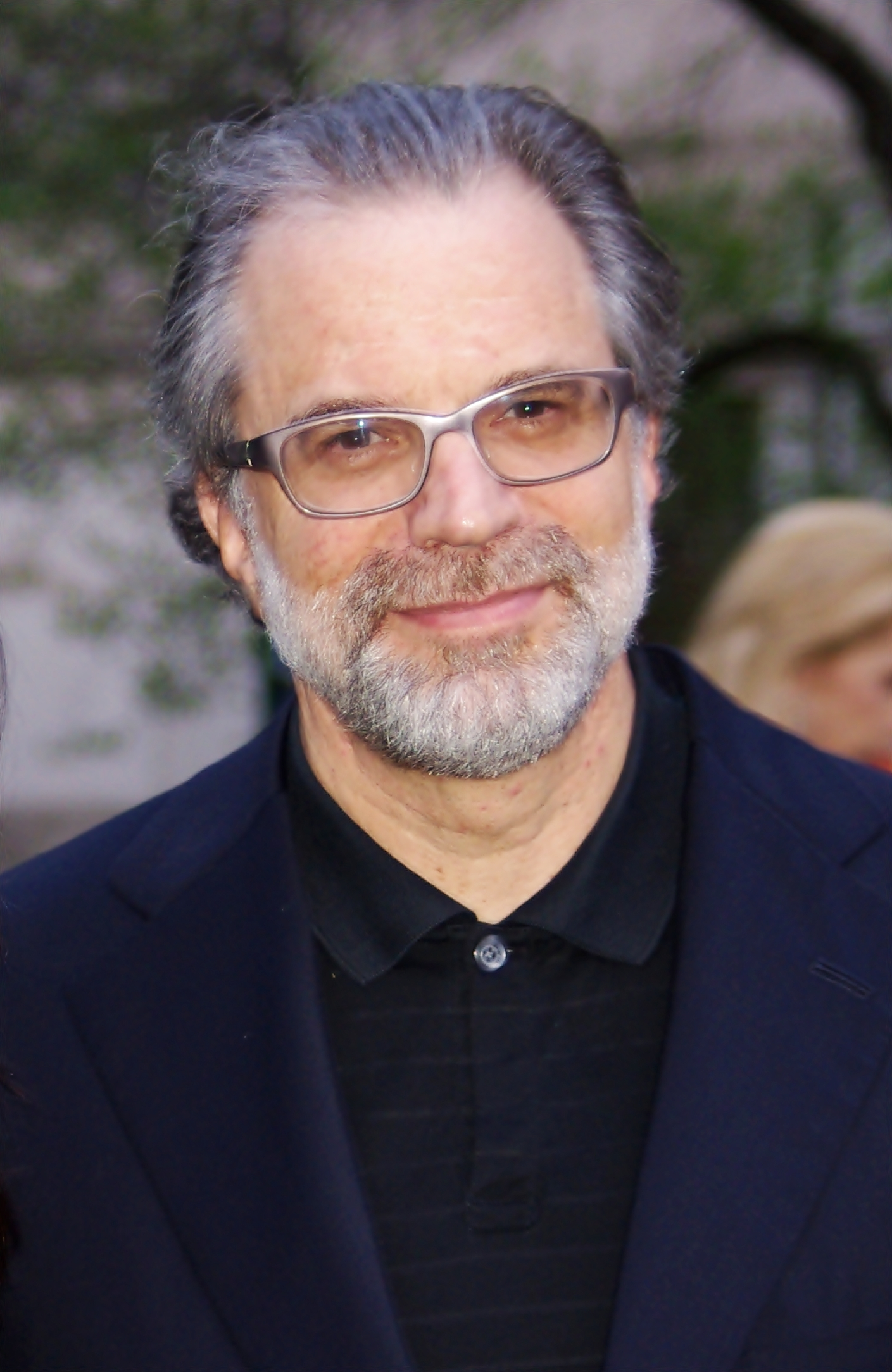
- Born: 15 October 1952 (age 74); New York City, NY, United States
- Education: Yale University, Skowhegan School of Painting and Sculpture
- Known for: Photography, Video Art

Clifford Ross (born October 15, 1952) is an American artist who has worked in multiple forms of media, including sculpture, painting, photography and video. His work is in the collections of the Museum of Modern Art, the J. Paul Getty Museum, the Metropolitan Museum of Art, the Whitney Museum of American Art, the Museum of Fine Arts, Houston, The National Gallery of Art and the Philadelphia Museum of Art. He is Chair Emeritus of the Helen Frankenthaler Foundation.

== Biography ==
Ross was born in New York City, where he lives and works. His parents were Arthur Ross, a businessman, and Gloria F. Ross, a maker of tapestries. Ross graduated magna cum laude with a B.A. in Art and Art History from Yale University in 1974, and attended the Skowhegan School of Painting and Sculpture in 1973. After his college years, his painting was influenced by Abstract Expressionism and the Color Field School, which included his aunt, Helen Frankenthaler. In 1980, he broke off his relationship with Clement Greenberg and many of the artists around him, with the exception of his aunt, with whom he maintained a close relationship throughout her life. Following his early career in painting and sculpture, Ross began his photographic work in 1995. A major milestone in his work is the Hurricane series, begun in 1996. The black and white images in the series depict large-scale ocean waves shot by Ross while in the tumultuous surf, often up to his chest, and tethered to an assistant on land.

In 2002, in order to photograph Mount Sopris in Colorado, Ross invented the R1 camera, with which he made some of the highest resolution large-scale landscape photographs in the world. In 2005, he designed and built the R2 360 degree video camera and the i3 Digital Cyclorama with Bran Ferren and other imaging scientists at Applied Minds, Inc.

Ross's artistic output is defined by an ongoing embrace of realism and abstraction. Ross has described this process stating, "I can never quite reach the essence of my subject with a camera, so my artistic cycle shifts to a wide range of media and strategies, moving from realism to abstraction. It is a creative loop of dissatisfaction. After using a variety of abstract means, I revert back to using a camera. And so on. Making art is an endless chase."

Ross's more recent collaborations include Harmonium Mountain I with an original score by Philip Glass, a site-specific, multi-screen production with the Orchestra of St. Luke's at Celebrate Brooklyn!, a multimedia installation in Beijing with Pan Gongkai, President of the Central Academy of Fine Arts, and a 3.5 ton, 28' x 28' stained glass wall with Franz Mayer of Munich, and architects Mack Scogin and Merrill Elam for the U.S. Federal Courthouse in Austin, Texas.

Landscape Seen & Imagined, a major mid-career survey of Ross's work, was held at MASS MoCA in 2015 through early 2016. It included a massive, multi-screen outdoor installation of his Harmonium Mountain I video world with twelve 24' x 18' screens. The exhibition was the first to feature new work in both the Wood and Digital Wave series including 24' high x 114' long photograph on wood veneer that spanned the length of MASS MoCA's tallest gallery and the artist's Wave Cathedral, which presented a large-scale immersive environment on LED walls.

Ross is a contributing editor for BOMB magazine and edited the book Abstract Expressionism: Creators and Critics (Abrams, 1990). He was elected to serve as the first Chair of the Helen Frankenthaler Foundation after her death in 2011, and served as Chair until 2021. He remained a board member until 2025, and now serves as Director Emeritus. His work has been widely exhibited in galleries and museums in the United States, as well as in Europe, Brazil, and China.

In the winter of 2026, the National Gallery of Art presented "Clifford Ross: Digital Waves", an immersive 23'-high video installation from the artist's ongoing exploration of the sea and his fascination with rendering the complexity, power, and dynamism of ocean movement through computer-generated media.

== Works ==
=== Painting and sculpture ===
Between 1974 and 1979, Ross's painting and sculpture work was entirely abstract. He determined that the only way forward was to find his own way into abstraction with a proper base in realism like the Abstract Expressionists and Color Field artists whom he admired. Ross stopped exhibiting for four years, studying figurative painting and sculpture at the National Academy of Design, and then continued on his own. By 1987, he was producing paintings that were tied to landscape imagery, but with a high degree of physical materiality and abstraction. In order to explore the landscapes that served as inspiration for his painting and sculptural works, Ross often took photographic studies, at times even using them as collaged elements to create imaginary scenes. Eventually, Ross's use of photography took over and by the mid-1990s he began to produce his first serious works in the medium.

=== Hurricane Waves ===
The series was originally photographed from 1996 to 2001 and was then extended by Ross in 2008, when he chose to capture the imagery with a digital camera instead of film. All the waves in the series were generated by hurricanes. Among his influences is J. M. W. Turner, with whom Ross shares a fascination with the violence of the sea. Ross has said, “[w]hen I’m shooting, the wind is often howling, the water is churning and pulling at me… A still image doesn’t move. But I have to try and deliver the wonder of movement through its absence—to find ways to telegraph the anxiety and delight of movement through a fixed image.” His drive to share the power of ocean waves with the viewer is not limited to his extreme efforts in capturing the image, but is central to Ross's obsessive and innovative printing methods as well. He spent a decade in the darkroom printing silver gelatin prints, and since 2009 has printed on wood veneer, pushing the photographic medium past its existing limits. He is known for his efforts to communicate the sublime in the Hurricane series, and in most of his other work as well.

=== Horizon and Grain ===
The Hurricane series led to two other bodies of work, the Horizon series and Grain series. The Horizons are small images of a placid ocean with a low horizon line, which show minimal waves in the foreground and large expanses of sky above. They reflect his appreciation of the ocean's calmer moments, when it is not buffeted by harsh weather. In the Grain series, photography was reduced to pure tonality, the subject reduced to light and the 'grain' of the film's emulsion, becoming not a picture, or a picture of nothing, but an almost pure abstraction. The resulting images may be the most abstract photographs ever made, but evoke the hypnotic and meditative power of the sea. The transition from his Hurricane photographs to the Horizon and Grain series is a good example of Ross's constant shifting between realism and abstraction. Taken as a group, the Hurricanes, Horizons and Grain series compose a trilogy known as Wave Music.

=== Mountains ===
Typical of Ross' dialectical working process, he found his next subject, far from the ocean in the Rocky Mountains of Colorado: Mount Sopris. Realizing the limitations of existing film and digital cameras, he invented the R1 high-resolution camera system, which uses military aerial film and a unique digital post-production process, capable of capturing the individual shingles on a barn from 4,000 feet away. The resulting photographs–the Mountain series–are among the highest resolution single shot landscapes in the world. He received U.S. Patent 6,795,648B1 for his camera.

This technical endeavor was developed in the service of Ross's artistic motivation–to reveal the immensity of his subject, its ever changing light, and its astonishing number of details, all contributing to his experience of the sublime. The resulting work has drawn parallels to the Hudson River School. Photographs in the Mountain series are printed in a large format that envelopes the viewer, creating a "you are there experience."

=== Mountain Redux and Harmonium Mountain ===
The Mountain Redux and Harmonium series signal a turn to abstraction based on the hyper-detailed Mountain photographs. Describing his trajectory from the Mountain series to his Mountain Redux work and the video world of Harmonium Mountain, Ross stated, “I broke down the realism of my ‘Mountain’ images into black-and-white negatives, printed them on handmade paper... eventually leapt into an abstract world of color, and then into movement with animation.” The five years of work on the original Mountain photographs were followed by 12 years of working with ever more abstract depictions of Mount Sopris, and that work is ongoing.

The short video known as Harmonium Mountain I, with an original score by Philip Glass, premiered at the Site Santa Fe International Biennial in 2010. The film’s official New York premiere was at the Tribeca Film Festival in 2011.

In 2012, Ross collaborated with Chinese musician and composer Wu Tong on Harmonium Mountain II, which had its world premiere at China's Central Conservatory of Music in Beijing in November of that year. The U.S. premiere of Harmonium Mountain II was at the Asia Society in New York City in March, 2015.

=== Austin Wall ===
In 2012, Ross was commissioned to execute a public art project for the newly built United States Courthouse in Austin, Texas, designed by Mack Scogin Merrill Elam Architects for the General Services Administration.

Ross’s high-resolution photograph of the Texas Hill Country was the basis for the imagery of a 28’ x 28’ stained glass wall, titled The Austin Wall. The wall includes oversize hydraulically controlled doors, which open to combine two large-scale interior spaces for public events. It was executed in conjunction with Franz Mayer & Co. of Munich, with whom Ross worked to combine centuries old stained glass techniques with 21st-century digital technology. The completed work was unveiled in 2013 and awarded the U.S. General Services Administration Honor Award in 2014.

=== Prints on Wood ===
Ross's engagement with wood and photography began while developing the General Services Administration commission to create artwork for the U.S. General Federal Courthouse in Austin. Although he ultimately executed a large-scale stained-glass wall, he continued to develop a method to print on wood for seven years, initially printing in his studio on thin veneers. Throughout the process, including hand-selecting trees in the Midwest and developing a deep sensitivity to the wood grain, their physicality transformed the works into something beyond photography. Known now as Wood Prints, the first large scale work, Sopris Wall I, was created in 2015 for MASS MoCA, executed on ninety 4' x 8' panels and measured 24' x 114'.

Subsequent projects include wood prints of Hurricane Waves in the exhibition Water | Waves | Wood at BRIC House in Brooklyn, and Light | Waves at the Parrish Art Museum in Southampton, New York.

=== Digital Waves ===
Ross's desire to create a "you are there" hurricane wave experience for the viewer resulted in the development of his Digital Waves, technically videos that are designed for display on oversize LED walls(using EIZO Monitors). The Digital Waves are completely computer generated, utilizing special algorithms to capture the unique movements and lyrical qualities of the sea, and although abstract, they reference the real world. They are made up of millions of moving dots, creating dramatic immersive experiences on the large LED walls.

While the origin of the series is the artist's Hurricane Wave series, the aesthetic is based in modernist abstraction, with Ross citing Jackson Pollock's drip paintings and Morris Louis's Veils as inspirations. Art historian David Anfam notes that they are "in effect a continuation of painting (most notably Abstract Expressionism) by other means, as indeed, are all [Ross's] ingenious digital effects and kindred approaches to the technological sublime."

The Digital Waves series is represented in private collections and has been presented at numerous public institutions, including MASS MoCA, the Portland Museum of Art (Maine), and the Fort Mason Center for Arts & Culture. The most recent installation, in 2026, is at the National Gallery of Art in Washington, DC

=== 2025 Painting Exhibition ===
In 2025, Ross exhibited his recent paintings at Schoelkopf Gallery in New York, selected from a body of approximately eighty works executed in 2020-21. Ross had quietly returned to painting as part of his artistic practice approximately 15 years earlier. Created with liquid graphite, the works built on abstract computer-generated iterations of his Mount Sopris photographs. The series combined Ross's longstanding interest in the natural world with the emotive possibilities of abstraction.

== Lectures and teaching ==
Ross has lectured in numerous university and museum settings, including Princeton, Yale, and New York University. He is a member of the Yale School of Art Dean's Advisory Board, which includes artists Chuck Close, Richard Serra, Byron Kim, and Sheila Hicks.

== Published works ==
- Seen & Imagined: The World of Clifford Ross. Edited by Joseph Thompson and Jay A. Clarke. Essays by David Anfam, Quentin Bajac, Arthur Danto, Jack Flam, Nicholas Negroponte, and Jock Reynolds. MIT Press, 2015
- Hurricane Waves: Clifford Ross. Edited by Jay A. Clarke. Essays by Phong Bui, Jay A. Clarke, and Orville Schell, and an interview by Schell. MIT Press, 2015
- Hurricane Waves. Essays by Phong Bui and Peng Feng. Zhejiang Art Museum, 2014
- Through the Looking Glass. Essay by Paul Goldberger. Hirmer, 2013
- Wave Music. Essay by Arthur C. Danto, interview by A.M. Homes. Blind Spot/Aperture, 2005
- "Big, Bigger, Biggest: Inventing Systems for Immense Digital Images (and Beyond)." Co-author with David Rogers, Carl Diegert, Michael Hawley, Bran Ferren, and Eric Rosenthal. Big Picture Summit, 2005
- The World of Edward Gorey. Co-author with Karen Wilkin. Abrams, 1996
- Abstract Expressionism: Creators and Critics. Editor. Abrams, 1991
- Phantasmagorey: The Work of Edward Gorey. Author. Yale University Press, 1974

== Exhibitions ==
Selected Solo Exhibitions:

- 2026, Clifford Ross: Digital Waves, National Gallery of Art, Washington, D.C.
- 2023, Clifford Ross: Hurricane Waves, Leila Heller Gallery, Dubai, United Arab Emirates
- 2021, Clifford Ross: Sightlines, Portland Museum of Art, Maine
- 2021, Clifford Ross: Prints on Wood, Ryan Lee Gallery, New York
- 2019, Clifford Ross: Waves, Boca Raton Museum of Art, Boca Raton, Florida
- 2017, Light | Waves, Parrish Art Museum, Water Mill, New York
- 2015, Landscape Seen & Imagined, MASS MoCA, North Adams, Massachusetts
- 2015, Water | Waves | Wood, BRIC House, Brooklyn, New York
- 2014, Hurricane Waves, Zhejiang Art Museum, Hangzhou, China
- 2014, Waves and Steel, Galerie Perrin, Paris
- 2011, Clifford Ross, Guild Hall, East Hampton, New York
- 2011, Landscape to Imagination, Sonnabend Gallery, New York
- 2009, Hurricanes, Sonnabend Gallery, New York
- 2009, Clifford Ross: Mountains and Sea, MADRE / Museo Archeologico Nazionale, Naples
- 2009, Photography: Beyond Realism, Robilant + Voena, London
- 2009, Clifford Ross Photography: Outside Realism (10–year survey), Austin Museum of Art, Texas
- 2008, Mountain Redux, Sonnabend Gallery, New York
- 2006, Clifford Ross, Galeria Javier Lopez, Madrid
- 2005, The Mountain Series, George Eastman House, Rochester, New York
- 2005, Mountain, Sonnabend Gallery, New York
- 2004, Grain Pictures and Horizons, Sonnabend Gallery, New York
- 1999, Works on Water, Edwynn Houk Gallery, New York
- 1997, Paintographs and Photographs, Houk Friedman Gallery, New York
- 1994, Paintings and Works on Paper, Salander-O'Reilly Galleries, New York
- 1988, Clifford Ross, Paintings, Corcoran Gallery of Art, Washington D.C.
- 1984, Sculpture & Paintings, Salander-O'Reilly Galleries, New York
- 1979, Watson/de Nagy Gallery, Houston, Texas
- 1976, Tibor de Nagy Gallery, New York, New York

Selected Group Exhibitions:

- 2016, The Beethoven Project (Digital Waves stage installation with a live performance by Julian Rachlin), 92nd Street Y, New York
- 2016, The Ileana Sonnabend Collection, Ca' Pesaro, International Gallery of Modern Art, Venice
- 2015, Harmonium Mountain (immersive stage video with a live performance by The Orchestra of St. Luke's), Celebrate Brooklyn!, New York
- 2014, Pan Gongkai and Clifford Ross: Alternate View, Zhejiang Art Museum, Hangzhou, China
- 2012, Clifford Ross and Richard Serra: Waves and Stacks, Yale University Art Gallery, New Haven, Connecticut
- 2012, Harmonium Mountain (screening of video with a live performance by Wu Tong), Central Conservatory of Music, Beijing
- 2012, In Focus: Picturing Landscape, J. Paul Getty Museum, Los Angeles
- 2011, Coal + Ice, Three Shadows Photography Art Centre, Beijing
- 2011, Ileana Sonnabend: An Italian Portrait, Peggy Guggenheim Collection, Venice
- 2011, Mannerism and Modernism: The Kasper Collection of Drawings and Photographs, Morgan Library and Museum, New York
- 2010, Waterways, Rose Art Museum of Brandeis University, Waltham, Massachusetts
- 2010, Harmonium Mountain I (premiere of video, with an original score by Philip Glass), SITE Santa Fe, Eighth International Biennial, New Mexico
- 2008, Clifford Ross and August Sander, Die Photographische Sammlung/SK Stiftung Kultur, Cologne
- 2007, Brasil des Focus, Centro Cultural do Banco do Brasil, Rio de Janeiro, Brazil
- 2007, Il Faut Rendre À Cézanne, Collection Lambert en Avignon, Museum of Contemporary Art, Avignon, France
- 2006, Andrew Wyeth and the American Landscape Tradition, Philadelphia Museum of Art
- 2006, Ecotopia: The Second ICP Triennial of Photography and Video, International Center of Photography, New York
- 2006, New Acquisitions, Museum of Modern Art, New York
- 2004, Visions of America: Contemporary Art from the Essl Collection and the Sonnabend Collection New York, Sammlung Essl, Vienna
- 2002, Photogenesis: Opus 2, Santa Barbara Museum of Art, California
- 2002, Visions from America: Photographs from the Whitney Museum of American Art 1940 – 2001, Whitney Museum of American Art, New York
- 1998, Recent Acquisitions, International Center of Photography, New York
- 1998, Waterproof, Centro Cultural de Belém: Expo '98, Lisbon
- 1988, The 1980's: A New Generation, Metropolitan Museum of Art, New York
- 1981, Figuratively Sculpting, The Institute for Art & Urban Resources, PS1, New York
