= Alfred Frankenthaler =

American lawyer and judge (1881–1940)

Alfred Frankenthaler (September 24, 1881 – January 7, 1940) was a Jewish-American lawyer and judge from New York City.

== Life ==
Frankenthaler was born on September 24, 1881, in New York City, New York, the son of Louis Frankenthaler and Mary Strauss. His brother was New York County Surrogate George Frankenthaler.

Frankenthaler attended City College and graduated from Columbia Law School in 1903. He was admitted to the bar in 1902, after which he practiced law and specialized in real estate law. From 1918 to 1919 he worked as an Assistant in the New York Port Alien Enemy Bureau of the Department of Justice. In 1922, he consulted clients in Germany and sought to have the American government compensate Telefunken for the confiscation of its Sayville wireless station during World War I. In 1923, Governor Al Smith appointed him a member of a commission that investigated defects in the law and its administration. In 1926, Mayor Jimmy Walker appointed him a member of the City Planning and Survey Committee, which would make a survey of the city and plan for its future needs.

Frankenthaler was a member of Tammany Hall's Law Committee and Finance Committee as well as the Osceola Club of the Fifteenth Assembly District. He was the campaign manager for General Sessions Judge Cornelius F. Collins in 1922, and in 1924 he was the treasurer of the campaign committee for City Court judge Bernard L. Shientag. In 1926, he was the Democratic candidate for Justice of the New York Supreme Court, First Judicial District. He won the election and served as Justice for the rest of his life. As Justice, he dealt with a number of cases related to the rehabilitation of title and mortgage guarantee companies, especially during the Great Depression. He cooperated with the New York State Insurance Department to reorganize many mortgage certificate properties. He also developed a special type of trusteeship for such cases, which became known throughout the country as the Frankenthaler plan for reorganization.

Frankenthaler was a member of Temple Emanu-El. He was a law committee member of the Real Estate Board of New York, a director of the Alumni City College of the City of New York, treasurer of the City College Club, and a member of the New York County Lawyers' Association, the New York State Bar Association, the American Bar Association, the Columbia Law School Alumni, the Free Sons of Israel, the Jewish Probation Society, the Federation of Jewish Philanthropic Societies of New York, the National Democratic Club, and the Grand Street Boys Association. In 1921, he married charity worker Martha Lowenstein at the St. Regis Hotel in a ceremony performed by Rabbi Rudolph Grossman. Their children were Marjorie, Gloria, and Helen.

Frankenthaler died at home on January 7, 1940. 2,500 people attended his funeral at Temple Emanu-El. The Temple's rabbi Samuel H. Goldenson conducted the service and Senator Robert F. Wagner delivered the eulogy. The honorary pallbearers consisted of a number of jurists and city and state officials, including Mayor Fiorello La Guardia and Governor Al Smith. He was buried in Mount Neboh Cemetery.
