= Murray Hidary =

American businessman

Murray Hidary (born August 30, 1971) is an American composer, fine art photographer, and entrepreneur of Syrian origin.

== Business career ==
=== EarthWeb/Dice Inc. ===
Murray Hidary began his business career in 1994 at the age of 23 when he co-founded EarthWeb with his older brother, Jack Hidary, and Nova Spivack. While EarthWeb was one of the first internet consulting companies, it shifted focus in 1997 when Tristan Louis was brought in to turn the company into an IT information portal called developer.com. EarthWeb's initial public offering on November 11, 1998, closed at US$48.69 per share, up 247.8% from its opening price of $14. At the time, EarthWeb's first-day return was among the largest in NASDAQ history.

In 2000, EarthWeb changed its name to Dice Inc, taking the company private and renaming itself after its flagship property dice.com, the leading career website for technology and engineering professionals In 2005 private equity firms Quadrangle and General Atlantic Partners acquired Dice Inc. for approximately US$200 million. Dice Inc. subsequently went public on the New York Stock Exchange in 2007 and trades under the ticker symbol DHX.

Murray Hidary left the company in January 2001, but continued to serve on the board through April 2002.

=== Vista Research ===
In 2001 Hidary co-founded Vista Research with his brother Jack Hidary. The firm pioneered the field of expert network research providers, catering to top-tier investment funds. Vista Research provides hedge fund and asset managers with access to an extensive network of experts in industries including technology, media, telecommunications, energy, aerospace and healthcare.

In April 2005 the company was acquired by the Standard & Poor's division of McGraw-Hill. In 2009 McGraw-Hill sold Vista Research to Guidepoint Global, a global consulting and research firm.

=== iAmplify ===
Murray Hidary and Jack Hidary founded iAmplify in 2005. iAmplify is a Web-based content publisher and syndication network for professionals in a broad range of fields. The site features simple tools for use by specialists to distribute their media. Users range from individuals to large corporations. iAmplify has established prominent partnerships with Bloomberg, David Allen, Yoga Journal, Marianne Williamson, Condé Nast's Golf Digest, and Eckhart Tolle.

With pressure on the publishing industry mounting, Hidary was one of the first to envision taking readers “beyond the book,” and provide a platform for authors to forge a direct relationship with their audience.

=== Primary Insight ===
In 2009 Murray Hidary re-entered the expert network industry with his most recent endeavor: Primary Insight. The Hidary Group backed a management buyout of Primary Insight from J.P. Morgan led by former colleagues, David DeRose and Leighton Thomas. J.P. Morgan retains a minority interest.

Primary Insight is a consulting firm for a variety of industries, and caters to hedge funds and institutional investors.

=== eBillity ===
Murray is also the co-founder of eBillity, a cloud-based SaaS business platform.

=== Givme ===
Hidary partnered with co-founder Robert Etropolsky. Givme is a private, location-based, photo-sharing app for friends.

== Music career ==
Murray Hidary majored in Music and Composition at NYU. After college, he continued his musical pursuits in parallel with his business ambitions. His primary compositional mentor was Paul Alan Levi. Additional influences include composers of the minimalist movement including, Philip Glass, Terry Riley, and Steve Reich, as well as, the contrapuntal techniques from the Baroque period. In his music, he employs many organic mathematical processes as well as a layering technique that creates a rich and textured effect.

Hidary recorded his first symphony in St. Petersburg, Russia in 2004. Entitled Motion, it was performed by The St. Petersburg Philharmonic and conducted by Paul Alan Levi.

=== Original compositions ===
- Motion, symphony for strings and two sopranos

Conducted by: Paul Alan Levi Performed by: The St. Petersburg Philharmonic

- Spinning Still, for eight strings

Conducted by: Paul Alan Levi

Performed by: ETHEL & Friends - Kenji Bunch (viola), Malrl Dorman-Planeuf (cello), Neil Duffallo (violin), Ralph Farris (viola), Ariana Kim (violin), Dorothy Lawson (cello), Mary Rowell (violin), and Wendy Sutter (cello)

- In Solitude, for solo piano

Performed by: Paolo Tatafiore

- As you Like, duet for shakuhachi (Japanese flue) and violin

Performed by: Yoshio Kurahashi (shakuhachi) and Eaisun Shin (violin)

- Ubiquity Changed, piano improvisations
- Piano Quintet 1+4, piano improvisations with string quartet

Performed by: ETHEL & Murray Hidary at the Crest Theater, Los Angeles.

=== Mind Travel ===
Hidary is the creator of Mind Travel. He performs real-time compositions at the piano. These performances feature his solo piano with visual art installations. Mind Travel has also featured performances by ETHEL including the premiere of Hidary's Piano Quintet. Concert venues include The Metropolitan Museum of Art in New York City, The Soho House in West Hollywood, New York City, Chicago and Miami, The Crest Theater, The Carlsbad Music Festival, St Regis Hotel in Aspen, The Mind Body Green Revitalize Conference in Arizona, Unplug Meditation Studio, The Shine in Los Angeles and the Listening Room in NYC.

== Photography career ==
Murray Hidary first began experimenting with photography during a cross-country road trip when he was 17 years old. He continued his travel and nature photography after his first semester at NYU, when at the age of 18, he took a leave of absence from college and spent 8 months riding a bicycle over 10,000 miles throughout Thailand, Malaysia, Singapore, Fiji, New Zealand and Australia.

Hidary's work has garnered wide praise, regularly appears in gallery and museum exhibitions, and is held in many private collections. His photography has appeared in myriad group shows including the San Francisco MoMA's 15th Biennial Auction (San Francisco, CA), at the Guggenheim Museum (New York, NY), and the San Diego Art Institute (San Diego, CA). Solo exhibitions of Hidary's work have been featured at Atelier (New York, NY), Metro Gallery (Reno, NV), Karpeles Museum (Santa Barbara, CA), East Link Gallery (Shanghai, China), and the Nabokov Museum (St. Petersburg, Russia).

Hidary's work is also part of Art Pic's collection of available pieces in Los Angeles, CA. Through Art Pic, Hidary's photographs have been featured in movies and television including FOX's House, CBS's Numbers and NBC's Joey, and films such as My Best Friend's Girl and Unhitched. Hidary's work also appeared in a Revlon advertisement and a Nikon television ad campaign featuring Ashton Kutcher, as well as the flagship Ralph Lauren store in New York, NY.

In June 2015, he won 1st Place, Still Life at the Florida Museum of Photographic Arts, International Photography Competition.

== Philanthropy and other pursuits ==
Hidary is a member of several philanthropic boards. His continued love of music led him to ETHEL, a contemporary “postclassical” string quartet, for whom he now serves as chairman of the board. ETHEL has also performed original works by Murray Hidary including Spinning Still in 2006 and his Piano Quintet in 2015. Additionally, Hidary is a board member for Four Way Books, a publisher of poetry and short fiction by both emerging and established writers.

In 2006 NYU awarded Murray Hidary the Distinguished Service Award. The text of his commencement acceptance speech is available here.

Outside of Hidary's business and artistic pursuits, he travels extensively. He has also trained for and completed three marathons: New York City 2007, New York City 2008, and London 2007. He has a passion for the environment and supports alternative energy.
