= Paul Alan Levi =

American composer (born 1941)

Paul Alan Levi (born June 30, 1941, in New York City) is an American composer whose compositions have been performed in Carnegie Hall, among other major venues in United States and Europe, as well as on national television. He is the composer of the 1971-1984 PBS identity music.

== Biography ==
Levi received a B.A. in music at Oberlin College and later received his M.M. and D.M.A at Juilliard while studying with composition teachers Hall Overton and Vincent Persichetti.

He has taught at the Aaron Copland School of Music, Rutgers University, Manhattan School of Music, New York University, Lehman College, and Baruch College, and has been the composer in residence at Wolf Trap Farm Park, Portland State University, and the White Plains High School.

Levi has won numerous awards and grants including a Guggenheim Fellowship, the Grand Prize for Opera from the National Music Theater Network, Fellowships from the National Endowment for the Arts, the American Composers Alliance Recording Award, and grants from the American Music Center and Meet the Composer. He lived for a year in Munich on a DAAD Grant and has had residencies at several artist colonies.

Levi's commissions include the Chamber Music Society of Lincoln Center, New York Choral Society, New Amsterdam singers, New York Chamber Symphony, Chamber Music Northwest, Robert DeCormier Singers, and the Music Today Series. Performers of his music include conductors Pierre Boulez, Jesús López-Cobos, Robert De Cormier, Clara Longstreth, Gustav Meier, and Gerard Schwarz; pianist Justin Kolb; and singers Margaret Ahrens, David Bender, Adam Klein, Antonia Lavanne, Douglas Perry, Neva Pilgrim, Lucy Shelton, Sheila Schonbrun, and James Archie Worley, as well as Cantors Richard Botton and Mark Lipson.

Publishers include Becatone Music, Lawson-Gould Music Publishers, Margun Music, Merion Music, Mobart Music Publications, and New Jewish Music Press. Recordings can be heard on Albany Records (Acts of Love; Bye, Bye Toots), Centaur Records (Mark Twain Suite), and CRI (Five Progressions for Three Instruments).

== Musical style ==
Levi composes in a wide variety of styles and genres, never pigeonholing himself as a composer of a specific type of music. His vocal and choral works are notable for their clear projection of content and meaning of the text without compromising the quality of the music. In addition to his many works written for professional performers, Levi has composed a group of pieces that were commissioned as presents for major birthdays of amateur musicians, including cellist James Wolfensohn.

Levi writes, “The most important thing I learned from Hall Overton was to write with a comedian's sense of timing, even in non-comedic works.” His pieces feature a combination of lyricism and drama, often with an underlying or overt sense of humor. His most significant works, both for chorus, orchestra, and soloists, include the comedic Mark Twain Suite as well as his Passover Oratorio, Dayenu, which commemorates the Exodus from Egypt and an escape from a concentration camp during the Holocaust. The New Music Connoisseur has written, “Mr. Levi has a natural flair for theatrical choral music”. Like many composers, Mr. Levi has written memorial works, but also has composed a piece celebrating birth, In the Womb, for chorus with electronic accompaniment.

Levi has been an influential composition teacher to many composers including Alex Weiser and Murray Hidary. Levi is also a pianist and conductor. He has accompanied many songs by 20th-century composers and conducted his own works as well as musicals, operettas, and the works of Murray Hidary. Levi and his wife, Cathy Waldman, have performed as the Four-Hand Band.

== Selected Musical Works ==
=== Choral works ===
- Dateless Calendar (2010)

Poems by Sally Fisher For chorus and chamber orchestra

- Acts of Love (2002)

Poems by Sally Fisher For chorus and chamber orchestra (Albany Records)

- “In the Womb”

From In the Beginning... (2000) Libretto by Toni Mergentime Levi Chorus with electronic accompaniment

- Bye, Bye Toots: A Memorial Cantata (1998)

Based on poems by Ann Chernow and Burt Chernow For chorus and piano (Lawson-Gould Music Publishers)

- Dayenu (1996)

A Passover Oratorio For tenor and baritone solos, chorus and orchestra (Mobart Music Publications)

- Journeys & Secrets (1994)

Poems by Toni Mergentime Levi For chorus and chamber orchestra (Mobart Music Publications)

- Holy Willie's Prayer (1992)

Text by Robert Burns For chorus and chamber orchestra (Mobart Music Publications)

- Bow Down Thine Ear, O Lord (1991)

Psalms 86 and 19 For 8 voices or double chorus, a cappella

- Songs for the Synagogue (1989)

Co-composer: Rabbi Mark Lipson For cantor, adult and children's choirs, and quintet or chamber orchestra (New Jewish Music Press)

- Mark Twain Suite (1983)

For chorus, tenor solo and orchestra (Lawson-Gould Music Publishers)

=== Chamber works ===
- Not in 4 (2008) for piano four-hands
- Maverick (2006) for violin and guitar
- Second String Quartet (2004)
- Activities (2000) for flute and piano
- Bow Jest (1983) for solo cello
- Elegy and Recreations (1980) for oboe, clarinet, horn, string trio, piano(Margun Music)
- Five Progressions for Three Instruments for flute, clarinet and viola (CRI Records)
- String Quartet #1 (1970)

=== Solo vocal ===
- Six Yiddish Scenes (2002) for low voice and piano, also for high voice or chorus with piano
- Zeno's Arrow (2001) Seven Songs to Poems by Jan Schreiber for tenor or soprano and piano
- Black Wings (1986) texts by Randall Jarrell for soprano and piano
- This Much I Know (1983) text by Gertrude Stein for soprano and piano
- Spring Sestina (1982) text by Toni Mergentime Levi for soprano, fl, ob, cl, bsn, vib, pno, vln, va, vc, bass (Margun Music)
- “The Truth” (1975) text by Randall Jarrell for soprano, solo cello, flute, clarinet, bassoon, piano, harpsichord, string quartet
- Jabberwocky (1968) text by Lewis Carroll for voice and piano

=== Orchestral ===
- Transformations of the Heart (1987)
- Symphonic Movement (1972)

=== Piano Solo ===
- Venetian Mazes (2012)
- Suite for the Best of Hands (1999)
- Touchings (1990)
- Suite for the Best of Times (1991)
- Summer Elegy (1982)

=== Opera ===
- In the Beginning... (2000)

Libretto by Toni Mergentime Levi An opera parable in seven scenes

- Thanksgiving (1976)

A serio-comic opera in one act Libretto by Toni Mergentime Levi For 12 singers and chamber orchestra

=== Birthday commissions ===
- Zeno's Arrow (2001) Seven Songs to Poems by Jan Schreiber for tenor or soprano and piano
- Activities (2000) for flute and piano
- Suite for the Best of Hands (1999) for solo piano
- Suite for the Best of Times (1991) for solo piano
- Bow Jest (1983) for solo cello

=== Title themes for television ===
- Cuisine Rapide (1989)
- Ossie and Ruby (1987)
- Madeleine Cooks (1986)
- PBS Signature Tune (1971–1984)

=== Music for television and films ===
- Years In The Making, Documentary on Late Life Creativity especially in Wesport, CT(2009)
- A Gathering of Glory, documentary on 100 years of the arts in Westport, CT (2003)
- Divorced Kids’ Blues, jazz-cum-Bach score for Afterschool Special, ABC-TV (1987)
- Daddy Can't Read, rock score for Afterschool Special, ABC-TV (1987)
- The Natural History of the Water Closet: A Documentary Cantata Choral/orchestral music for PBS film (1976)
- Who Built This Place? Piano ragtime score for PBS documentary on landmark architecture (1972)
