= Jack Hidary =

American businessman and technologist

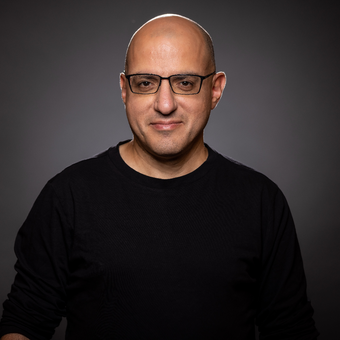
- Born: Brownsville, Brooklyn, New York City, U.S.
- Education: Columbia University
- Known for: CEO and founder of SandboxAQ

Jack D. Hidary is the CEO of AI and quantum technology company SandboxAQ.

Hidary has collaborated with MIT on a series of papers focused on AI and deep learning. In particular, the papers address the ability of deep learning networks to generalize to cases beyond the training data. Hidary is also the author of Quantum Computing: An Applied Approach, in its second edition and published by Springer.

== Early life and education ==
Hidary was born to a Syrian-Jewish family at the Brookdale Hospital in the Brownsville section of Brooklyn and raised near Coney Island. He is the oldest of four brothers and a sister. He attended school at Yeshivah of Flatbush.

Hidary studied philosophy and neuroscience at Columbia University but left before graduating to complete a Stanley Fellowship in Clinical Neuroscience at the National Institutes of Health. At NIH, he focused on functional MRI studies of brain function and the application of neural network technologies to the analysis and modelling of fMRI imaging data and brain function.

== Entrepreneurial career ==
In 1995, Jack Hidary co-founded the IT information portal EarthWeb with his brother Murray Hidary and entrepreneur Nova Spivack. In 1998, they took the company public, garnering one of one of the largest first-day returns in NASDAQ history. In 1999, under Hidary's leadership, EarthWeb acquired the tech career website Dice.com. In 2000, the company was renamed Dice Inc and then later DHI Holdings, Inc.

Hidary co-founded Vista Research in 2001 as an independent financial research company serving institutional investors, drawing on experts in the fields of technology, media, telecommunications, energy, aerospace and healthcare. Vista Research was acquired in 2005 by the Standard & Poor’s division of McGraw-Hill.

=== SandboxAQ ===
In 2016, Hidary founded a quantum technology group at Alphabet Inc. In 2022, it was spun out into a standalone company, SandboxAQ, with Hidary as CEO and Eric Schmidt as Chairman.

At launch, Reuters reported the company had raised a ‘nine-figure’ initial funding round from investors including Schmidt, Breyer Capital, T. Rowe Price funds, TIME Ventures and others. In 2023, Reuters confirmed that the amount raised was $500 million. Under Hidary’s leadership, the company has secured several government contracts for its quantum-resistant cybersecurity solutions, launched a quantum navigation pilot program with the U.S. Air Force, and launched a molecular simulation division to accelerate drug discovery. In 2024, The Information reported that the company was facing difficulties commercializing its technology. The company has released a number of open source datasets for AI training in chemical and biological science.

In 2025, Quantum Computing Report reported that Michael J. Wolf, CEO of Activate Consulting, had joined the board of directors. Wolf was formerly global managing partner of McKinsey & Company, and president and chief operating officer of MTV Networks. He was an advocate for Jack Hidary's mayoral candidacy in 2013.

As of 2025, it was reported that SandboxAQ's software was being used for pharmaceutical development and drug discovery.

NVIDIA has partnered with the company. They jointly released publicly available datasets including Structurally Augmented IC50 Repository (SAIR), the largest public dataset of protein-ligand pairs with annotated experimental binding potency data; AQCat25, a dataset and model of high-fidelity quantum chemistry calculations; and AQAffinity, an open source AI model that predicts protein–ligand binding affinity.

== Social and policy initiatives ==
In 2008, Hidary helped draft the Cash for Clunkers program. He has been a vocal proponent of renewable energy. He is a trustee of the X Prize Foundation and the co-founder of the Auto X Prize, which inspired the development of highly fuel-efficient vehicles.

Hidary has served as a partner or trustee for numerous New York City groups, including the Partnership for New York City and the Citizens Budget Commission.

He has served on several boards including the advisory council for the National Renewable Energy Lab (NREL). He is on the board of the X Prize Foundation.

In a 2026 op-ed for The Wall Street Journal, Hidary argued that in order to compete with China economically, the United States needs greater advancement in quantum computing and the development of artificial intelligence in areas outside of large language models in addition to quantum computing, as these could be used to drive advancements in material science and biotechnology.

== Politics ==
On July 17, 2013, Hidary announced his intent to run for New York City Mayor as an independent on a new party line called the Jobs and Education Party and succeed Michael Bloomberg. The New York Times described his political leanings as "socially progressive, fiscally reserved, and digitally savvy," and his primary goals are to better education, foster small business growth and spur employment across all boroughs, and attract companies and investment to New York. One of his primary initiatives was to increase productivity by wiring all of the city’s schools, businesses and neighborhoods for broadband Internet service. Another focus was to increase the number of tech incubators and shared workspaces across the city.

On November 5, 2013, Hidary lost to Bill de Blasio in the mayoral election, receiving less than 0.5% of the vote.

Following the release of campaign records several weeks later, the Wall Street Journal reported that Hidary had "contributed more than $300,000 to his unsuccessful campaign in a possible violation of city campaign finance law." The New York City Campaign Finance Board later imposed a fine of $14,433 for various campaign financial violations.
