= Pygmy music =

Sub-Saharan African music tradition

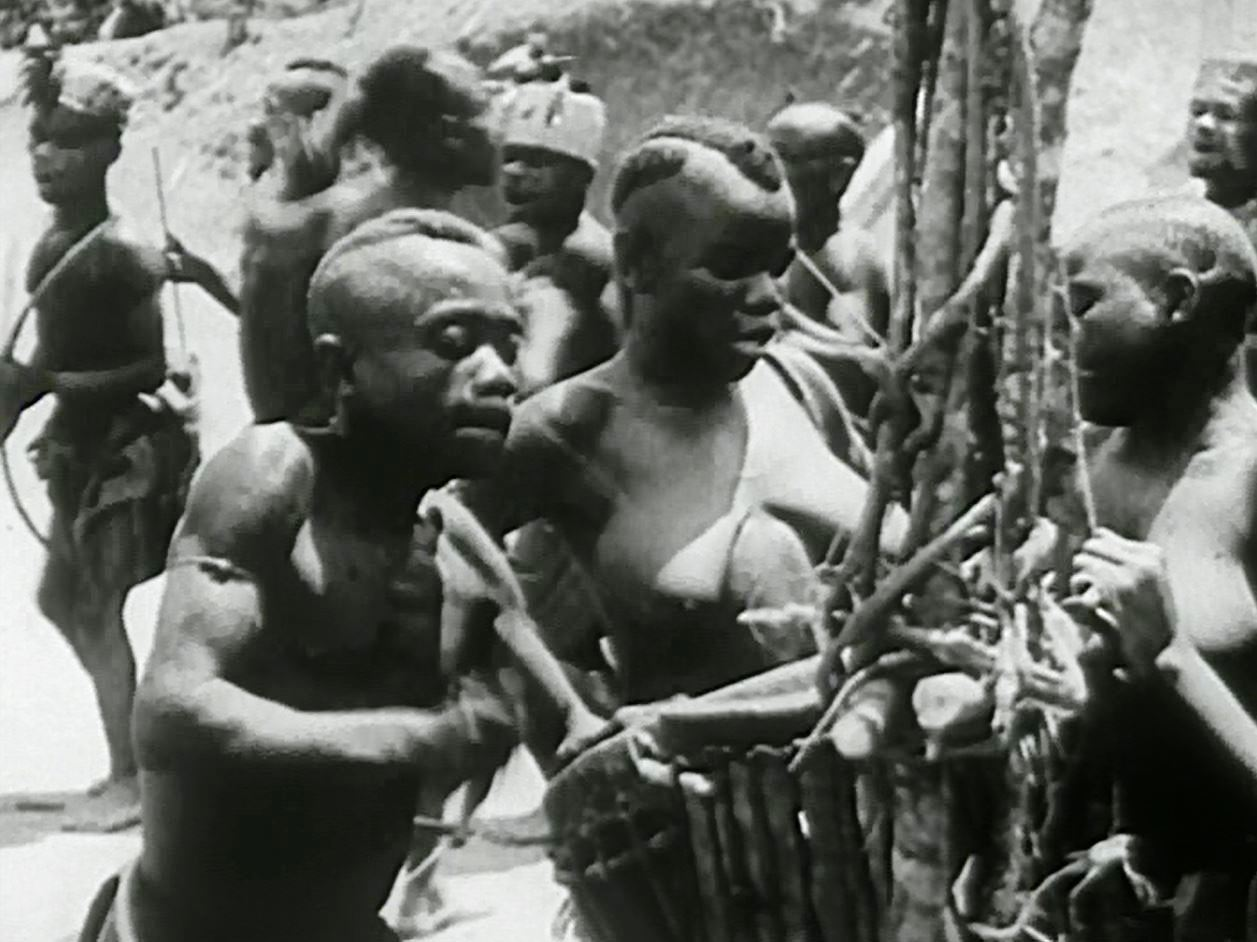
Pygmy drummers, 1930

Pygmy music refers to the sub-Saharan African music traditions of the Central African foragers (or "Pygmies"), predominantly in the Congo, the Central African Republic and Cameroon.

Pygmy groups include the Bayaka, the Mbuti, and the Batwa.

Music is an important part of Pygmy life, and casual performances take place during many of the day's events. Music comes in many forms, including the spiritual likanos stories, vocable singing and music played from a variety of instruments including the bow harp (ieta), ngombi (harp zither) and limbindi (a string bow).

Researchers who have studied Pygmy music include Simha Arom, Louis Sarno, Colin Turnbull and Jean-Pierre Hallet.

== Polyphonic song ==
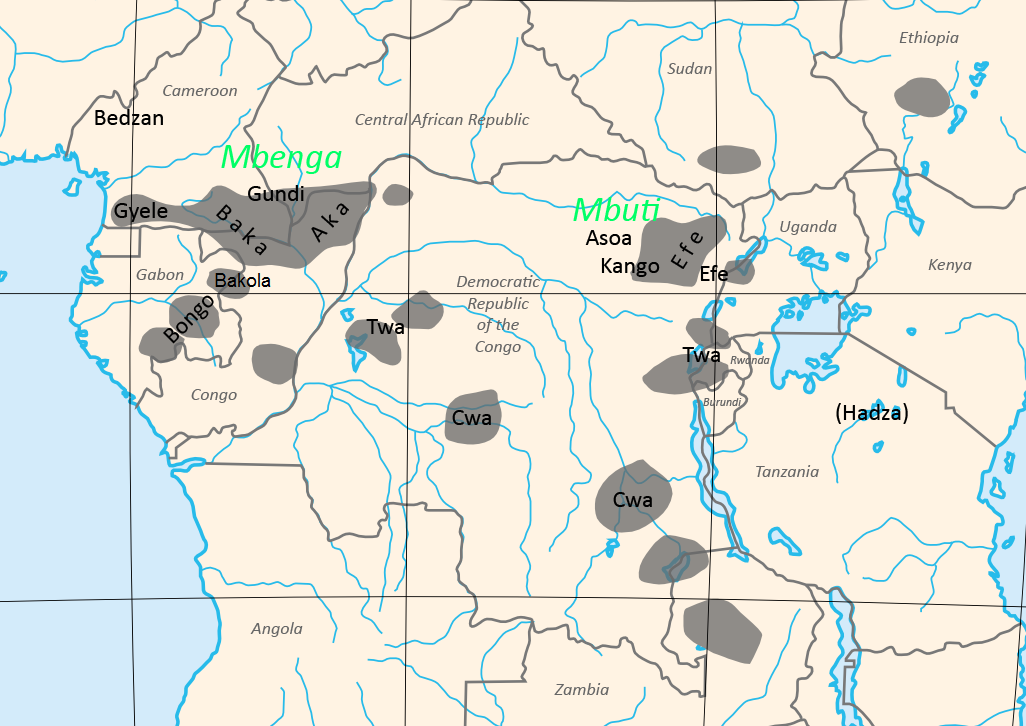
Location of pygmy peoples

The Mbenga (Aka/Benzele) and Baka peoples in the west and the Mbuti (Efé) in the east are particularly known for their dense contrapuntal communal improvisation. Simha Arom says that the level of polyphonic complexity of Mbenga–Mbuti music was reached in Europe only in the 14th century. The polyphonic singing of the Aka Pygmies was relisted on the Representative List of the Intangible Cultural Heritage of Humanity in 2008.

Mbenga–Mbuti Pygmy music consists of up to four parts and can be described as an "ostinato with variations" similar to a passacaglia in that it is cyclical. It is based on repetition of periods of equal length that each singer divides using different rhythmic figures specific to different repertoires and songs. This creates a detailed surface and endless variations not only of the same period repeated but of various performances of the same piece of music. As in some Balinese gamelan music, these patterns are based on a super-pattern which is never heard. The Pygmies themselves do not learn or think of their music in this theoretical framework, but learn the music growing up.

Polyphonic music is only characteristic of the Mbenga and Mbuti. The Gyele/Kola, Great Lakes Twa and Southern Twa have very different musical styles.

== Liquindi ==
Liquindi is water drumming, typically practiced by Pygmy women and girls. The sound is produced by persons standing in water, and hitting the surface of the water with their hands, such as to trap air in the hands and produce a percussive effect that arises by sudden change in air pressure of the trapped air. The sound cannot exist entirely in water, since it requires the air-water boundary as a surface to be struck, so the sound is not hydraulophonic.

== Hindewhu ==
Hindewhu is a style of singing/whistle-playing of the BaBenzélé pygmies of the Central African Republic. The term hindewhu is an onomatopoeia of the sound of a performer alternately singing pitched syllables and blowing into a single-pitch papaya-stem whistle, in an interlocked rhythm similar to the gutera-kwakira structure of the Burundian akazehe. Hindewhu announces the return from a hunt and is performed solo, duo or in groups.

== Western popularization ==
Colin M. Turnbull, an American anthropologist, wrote a book about the Efé Pygmies, The Forest People, in 1965. This introduced Mbuti culture to Western countries. Turnbull claimed that the Mbuti viewed the forest as a parental spirit with which they could communicate via song.

Some of Turnbull's recordings of Efé music were commercially released and inspired more ethnomusicological study such as by Simha Arom, a French-Israeli who recorded hindewhu, and Luis Devin, an Italian ethnomusicologist who studied in depth the musical rituals and instruments of Baka Pygmies.

Some popular musicians have used hindewhu in their music:

- "Hunting", a song by Deep Forest from their album Made in Japan.
- "Ba-Benzélé", a song by Jon Hassell and Brian Eno from the album Fourth World, Vol. 1: Possible Musics (1980).
- "Fabulous" (1983), a tune by John Oswald and Dick Hyman from the album plunderphonics (1989).
- Percussionist Bill Summers imitates hindewhu in the track "Watermelon Man" by Herbie Hancock from the 1973 album Head Hunters (see hocket).
- "Sanctuary", a song by Madonna from the album Bedtime Stories (1994) samples the Herbie Hancock recording.
- In 1992 the popularization of Pygmy music spread with the release of Eric Mouquet and Michel Sanchez's Deep Forest. A percentage of the proceeds from each album were donated to the Pygmy Fund set up to aid Zaire's Pygmies. The album was nevertheless subject to controversy, as the project used samples recorded by ethnomusicologist Hugo Zemp without permission; further controversy was stirred by the lack of consideration given to the original performer - a Northern Malaitian woman named Afunakwa - by either party during the resultant legal battle.
- Also in 1992 Martin Cradick and Su Hart spent three months living with and recording Baka in Cameroon. result was the creation of the band Baka Beyond and the release of their collaboration with the Baka musicians, "Spirit of the Forest" alongside the album "Heart of the Forest", and a musical relationship that has lasted over twenty years. Proceeds from both these albums have returned to the Baka musicians through the charity Global Music Exchange which continues to work with the Baka helping them in their rapidly changing environment.
- Pianist Pierre-Laurent Aimard programmed recordings of Pygmy songs (performed by the Aka Pygmies) with works of contemporary composers György Ligeti and Steve Reich on his African Rhythms (2003).

== Sources and further reading ==
- Abram, Dave. "Sounds From the African Rainforest". 2000. In Broughton, Simon and Ellingham, Mark with McConnachie, James and Duane, Orla (Ed.), World Music, Vol. 1: Africa, Europe and the Middle East, pp. 601–607. Rough Guides Ltd, Penguin Books. ISBN 1-85828-636-0
- Lotte Hughes, The No-Nonsense Guide to Indigenous Peoples (Verso, 2003) ISBN 1859844383, p 109
- Born, Georgina & Hesmondhalgh, David [ed.] (2000). Western Music and Its Others: Difference, Representation, and Appropriation in Music. University of California Press. pp. 156–159. ISBN 0-520-22084-6
- Plantenga, Bart. Yodel-Ay-Ee-Oooo: The Secret History of Yodeling Around the World. (Routledge, 2004) ISBN 978-0415939904.
- Plantenga, bart. Yodel in Hi-Fi: From Kitsch Folk to Contemporary Electronica. (University of Wisconsin Press / Autonomedia 2013-2017) ISBN 978-029929054-2.

== Discography ==
- Aka Pygmy Music. Recorded by Simha Arom. Philips 6586 016. Part of the UNESCO Collection (Musical Sources I-2); reissued as Auvidis D 8054.
- Ba-Benzélé Pygmies. Bärenreiter BM 30 L 2303. Part of the UNESCO Collection (third in the Anthology of African Music); reissued as Rounder CD 5107.
- Cameroon: Baka Pygmy Music (1977). EMI/Odeon 3C 064-18265. Part of the UNESCO Collection (Musical Atlas, #18); reissued as Auvidis D 8029 (1990).
- African Rhythms (2003). Music by Aka Pygmies, performed by Aka Pygmies, György Ligeti and Steve Reich, performed by Pierre-Laurent Aimard. Teldec Classics: 8573 86584-2. Liner notes by Aimard, Ligeti, Reich, and Simha Arom and Stefan Schomann.
- Music of the Rainforest Pygmies. Historic recordings made by Colin M. Turnbull. Lyrichord: LYRCD 7157.
- Echoes of the Forest: Music of the Central African Pygmies. Recordings by Colin M. Turnbull, Jean-Pierre Hallet and Louis Sarno. Ellipsis Arts: Musical Expeditions CD 4020
- Heart of the Forest: Music of the Baka Forest People of South-East Cameroon(1993). Recordings by Martin Cradick and Jeremy Avis. Hannibal Records: HNCD1378.
- Baka in the Forest: traditional songs of the Baka women recorded live in the Cameroon rainforest.(2009). Recordings by Su Hart. March Hare: MAHA CD29.
- "Voice of the Rainforest' (2013).Traditional Baka music recorded by Martin Cradick. March Hare Music: MAHA CD32.
- 'Gati Bongo'.(2006). Music by Orchestre Baka Gbiné, an entirely Baka band from S E Cameroon. March Hare Music. MAHA CD23.
- 'Kopolo'.(2012) The second album by Orchestre Baka Gbiné. March Hare Music: MAHA CD30.
