= Musical Atlas =

Recordings of traditional music

Musical Atlas is a series of recordings of traditional music that was made for the International Music Council by the International Institute for Comparative Music Studies and Documentation (Berlin/Venice) and released on the EMI/Odeon label. The series was directed by Alain Daniélou. It was part of the larger UNESCO Collection series. Most of the recordings were later re-issued on the Naive/Auvidis label.

== Recordings ==
#	Name	Year	Index number (EMI or EMI/Odeon)	Reissue (Auvidis)	Comments
1	Bengal	1972	3C 064-17840	D 8077 (1998)	Recordings, commentary and photographs by Manfred Junius et al.
2	Cambodia: Folk and Ceremonial Music	1972	3C 064-17841	D 8068 (1996)	Recordings, notes and photographs by Jacques Brunet.
3	Ivory Coast: Baulé Vocal Music	1972	3C 064-17842	D 8048 (1993)	Recordings and commentary by Hugo Zemp. Review by René Ménard in Yearbook of the International Folk Music Council 5 (1973), pp. 222–223, JSTOR 767534.
4	Portugal	1972	3C 064-17843	D 8008 (1988)	Recorded by Hubert de Fraysseix, Margarida Ribeiro and Virgílio Pereira; commentary by Alain Daniélou. Reviewed by James Porter in Ethnomusicology 20, #2 (May 1976), pp. 389–393, JSTOR 851030.
5	Bali: Folk Music	1972	3C 064-17858	D 8003 (1988)
6	India: North Indian Folk Music	1972	3C 064-17859	D 8033 (1991)	Recording and commentary by Manfred Junius.
7	Syria: Sunnite Islam	1973	3C 064-17885		Recorded by Jochen Wenzel; commentary by Christian Poché.
8	Greece: Traditional Music	1974	3C 064-17966	D 8018 (1990)	Recorded by Jacques Cloarec; commentary by Alain Daniélou.
9	Hong Kong: Instrumental Music	1974	3C 064-17968	D 8031 (1990)	Program notes by Dale A. Craig.
10	Japan: Semi-Classical and Folk Music	1974	3C 064-17967	D 8016 (1989)	Commentary by Shigeo Kishibe.
11	Algeria: Sahara, Music of Gourara	1975	3C 064-18079	D 8037 (1991)	Recording by Pierre Augier. Reviewed by Carl Cowl in Ethnomusicology 21, #3 (Sep. 1977), pp. 533–535, JSTOR 850751.
12	Thailand: The Music of Chieng Mai	1975	3C 064-18080	D 8007 (1988)	Recordings and commentary by Jacques Brunet.
13	Rumania: Traditional Folk Music	1975	3C 064-18120
14	Niger: The Music of the Peuls	1975	3C 064-18121	D 8006 (1988)	Recording and commentary by Simha Arom.
15	Dahomey: Bariba and Somba Music	1976	3C 064-18217	D 8057 (1994)	Recordings and commentary by Simha Arom.
16	Chile: Hispano-Chilean Metisse Traditional Music	1976	3C 064-18218	D 8001 (1988)	Recordings by Jochen Wenzel. Program notes by Manuel Dannemann.
17	Morocco: the Arabic Tradition in Moroccan Music	1977	3C 064-18264	D 8002 (1988)	Vocals and instrumentals by Abdeslam Cherkaoui. Recording and commentary by Philip D. Schuyler.
18	Cameroon: Baka Pygmy Music	1977	3C 064-18265	D 8029 (1990)	Recordings and commentary by Simha Arom and Patrick Renaud.
19	Pakistan: The Music of the Qawal (wandering minstrels)	1977	3C 064-18266	D 8028 (1990)	Recordings by Heinz Wergelt et Habib Hassan Touma; commentary by Alain Daniélou.
20	Viet-Nam: Ca Tru and Quan Ho	1978	3C 064-18310	D 8035 (1991)	Recordings and commentary by Trân Van Khê. Reviewed by Tran Quang Hai, Asian Music 11, #2 (1980), pp. 128–133, JSTOR 834067.
21	North Yemen: Traditional Music	1978	3C 064-18352	D 8004 (1988)	Recordings by Jochen Wenzel; commentary by Christian Poche.
22	Java: Sundanese Folk Music	1979	3C 064-18369	D 8051 (1994)	Recordings and commentary by Jacques Brunet.
23	Bahrain: Traditional Folk and Ceremonial Music	1979	3C 064-18371		Commentary by Habib Hassan Touma.
24	Irak	1979	3C 064-18370		Commentary by Habib Hassan Touma.
25	Bolivia: Panpipes	1981	3C 064-18528	D 8009 (1987)	Commentary and recordings by Louis Girault.
26	Bielorussie: Musical Folklore of the Byelorussian Polessye	1981	3C 064-18565	D 8005 (1988)
27	Turkey: Bektachi Music: Achik Songs	1982	3C 064-18568	D 8069 (1996)	Vocals and instrumentals by Ali Ekber Çiçek. Recordings by Kudsi Erguner; commentary by Bernard Mauguin and Kudsi Erguner.
28	Mexico : music of Pre-Columbian origin	1982	3C 064-18594		Notes by Jacques Soustelle.
29	Greece II: Vocal monodies	1983	64 1653841	D 8056 (1994)	Recording and brochure notes by Tatiana Yannopoulos and Simha Arom; photos by Simha Arom.
30	Bulgaria	1983	64 1653891	D 8019 (1990)	Notes by B. Mauguin.
31	Central African Republic	1983	1653901	D 8020 (1989)	Recordings and program notes by S. Arom.
32	Indian talas: The rhythmic art of north Indian music	1984	1653911		Recorded by Habib Hassan Touma. Brochure notes by Nikhil Gosh.
33	Antioch: Syrian Orthodox Church	1984	1653921	D 8039 (1992)	Recorded by Jochen Wenzel. Brochure notes by Christian Poche; photos by Jochen Wenzel.
34	Vietnam II: Court theatre music	1985	64 2602821	D 8058 (1994)	Recorded by Tran Van Khe with the collaboration of the Institute of Musicology of the Socialist Republic of Vietnam. Brochure notes by Tran Van Khe. Review by Phong Th. Nguyen in Yearbook for Traditional Music 19 (1987), 151-152, JSTOR 767911.
35	Canada: Music of the Inuit: The Copper Eskimo Tradition	1986	64 2402781	D 8053 (1994)	Recorded by J.F. and M. Le Mouel. Brochure notes by J.F. and M. Le Mouel. Review by Jean-Jacques Nattiez and Nicole Beaudry in Yearbook for Traditional Music 19 (1987), pp. 150–151, JSTOR 767910.
36	Java: Music of the Theatre	1985	64 2403201	D 8078 (1999)	Recordings, text, and photographs by Jacques Brunet. Reviewed by Patricia Matusky in Ethnomusicology 32, #2 (Spring-Summer, 1988), pp. 159–160, JSTOR 852053. Reviewed by R. Anderson Sutton in Yearbook for Traditional Music 19 (1987), pp. 156–157, JSTOR 767914.
