= Musical Sources =

Musical Sources is a series of recordings of traditional music that was made for the International Music Council by the International Institute for Comparative Music Studies and Documentation (Berlin/Venice) and released on the Philips label. Most of these recordings were later reissued on the Auvidis label. The series was directed by Alain Daniélou. It was part of the larger UNESCO Collection series.

== Recordings ==
	Name	Year	Index number (Philips)	Reissue (Auvidis)	Comments
I	The primeval cultures
I-1	Fataleka and Baegu Music/Malaita, Solomon Islands	1973	6586 018	D 8027 (1990)	Recorded by Hugo Zemp. Review by Mervyn McLean in The Journal of the Polynesian Society 84 (1975), #4, pp. 526–529 ; review by Laade Wolfgang in Journal de la Société des Océanistes 30, #45 (1974), pp. 314–315 .
I-2	Aka pygmy music	1973	6586 016	D 8054 (1994)	Recorded 1971 by Simha Arom. Review by Alan P. Merriam in Ethnomusicology, 20, #1 (Jan. 1976), pp. 166–167, JSTOR 850839.
II	Ceremonial, ritual, and magic music
II-1	Tibetan ritual	1971	6586 007	D 8034 (1991)	Recorded by Manfred Junius & P.C. Misra.
II-3	Shomyo-Buddhist ritual from Japan: Dai Hannya Ceremony-Shingon Sect	1974	6586 021	D 8036 (1991)
II-4	Islamic ritual from Yugoslavia: Zikr of the Rufa'i Brotherhood	1974	6586 015	D 8055 (1994)	Recorded in Kosovo. Review by Kurt Reinhard and James Porter in Ethnomusicology 22, #1 (Jan. 1978), pp. 212–214, JSTOR 851384.
II-5	Ceremonial music from northern Dahomey	1974	6586 022		Recorded 1973 by Simha Arom.
II-6	Fidjeri/Songs of the Bahrain Pearl Divers	1976?	6586 017	D 8046 (1992)	Recordings, notes and photos by Habib Hussan Touma. Review by Poul Rovsing Olsen in Ethnomusicology 25, #3, Pacific Issue (Sep. 1981), pp. 557–558, JSTOR 851577.
II-7	Zikr : Islamic ritual Rifa'iyya brotherhood of Aleppo	1975	6586 030	D 8013 (1989)
III	The language of rhythm
III-1	O-Suwa-Daiko: Japanese Drums. The Language of Rhythm	1978	6586 029	D 8030 (1990)
III-2	Iqa'at: Iraki traditional rhythmic structures	1979	6586 038	D 8044 (1992)	Program notes and recordings by Habib Hassan Touma.
III-3	Rhythms of the Manding	1979	6586 042
IV	Religious psalmody
IV-1	Jewish music	1971	6586 001		Recording and commentary by Amnon Shiloah. Review by Abraham Schwadron in Ethnomusicology 17, #2 (May 1973), pp. 388–391, JSTOR 849919.
IV-2	The music of the Syrian Orthodox Church	1973	6586 014	D 8075 (1998)
IV-3	Liturgical Chants for Lent and Easter Chants (Plain, Gregorian, etc.)	1975	6586 025	D 8015 (1989)	Program notes by Alain Daniélou.
VI	Modal music and improvisation
VI-1	Iranian Dastgah	1971	6586 005
VI-2	North India, Vocal Music, Dhrupad and Khyal	1971	6586 003	D 8076 (1998)	Review by Bonnie C. Wade in Ethnomusicology 17, #3 (September 1973), pp. 584–585, JSTOR 849983.
VI-3	Arabian music: Maqam	1971	6586 006
VI-4	Kurdish Music	1974	6586 019	D 8023 (1989)
VI-5	Egypt: Taqsim and layali	1972	6586 010	D 8038 (1991)
VI-6	North India, Instrumental Music, Sitar, Flute, Sarangi	1972	6586 009	D 8017 (1989)
VI-7	North India Instrumental Music, Vina, Vichitra Vina, Sarod, Shahnai	1974	6586 020	D 8021 (1989)
VI-8	Surynarayana Playing the South Indian Vina	1974	6586 023
VI-9	Azerbaijani mugam	1975	6586 027	D 8045 (1992)	Instrumentals by Bahram Mansurov. Reviewed by Inna Naroditskaya in Asian Music 28, #2 (Spring-Summer, 1997), pp. 141–145, JSTOR 834478.
VII	Sung poetry (secular and mystic)
VII-1	Sung Poetry of the Middle East	1975	6586 024	D 8025 (1989)
VII-2	Jewish-Yemenite Diwan Sung Poetry	1978	6586 037	D 8024 (1990)
VIII	Art music from the Far East
VIII-1	Korean music	1972	6586 011	D 8010 (1988)	Review by Robert C. Provine, Jr., Ethnomusicology 20, #2 (May 1976), pp. 394–396, JSTOR 851032
VIII-2	South Vietnam Entertainment Music	1975	6586 028	D 8049 (1993)	Review by Tran Quang Hai in Yearbook of the International Folk Music Council 9 (1977), pp. 145–146, JSTOR 767339.
IX	Art music from South-East Asia
IX-1	Bali: court music and banjar music	1971	6586 008	D 8059 (1994)
IX-2	Java: historic gamelans	197?	6586 004
IX-3	Royal music of Cambodia	1971	6586 002	D 8011 (1989)
IX-4	Traditional music of Southern Laos	1973	6586 012	D 8042 (1992)
IX-5	Music from Sunda, West Java	1976	6586 031	D 8041 (1992)
IX-6	Vocal art from Java	1979	6586 041	D 8014 (1989)
X	Theatre and dance music
X-1	Balinese theatre and dance music	1973	6586 013
X-?	Hát chèo: Vietnamese traditional folk theatre	1978	6586 035	D 8022 (1989)	Review by Tran Quang Hai in Asian Music 11, #2 (1980), pp. 134–136, JSTOR 834068; another review by Tran Quang Hai in Yearbook of the International Folk Music Council 11 (1979), pp. 156–158, JSTOR 767579.
XI	Pre-Columbian America
XI-1	Amerindian ceremonial music from Chili	1975	6586 026
XII	Instrumental and Vocal Traditions of Europe and the Mediterranean
XII-2	Yodel of Appenzell, Switzerland	1979	6586 044	D 8026 (1990)	Recorded by Hugo Zemp. Review by Dieter Christensen in Ethnomusicology 28, #2 (May 1984), pp. 372–374, JSTOR 850783; review by Maguy P. Andral in Yearbook for Traditional Music 16 (1984), pp. 136–137, JSTOR 768221.
XIII	Instrumental and vocal traditions of the Mediterranean
XIII-1	Meditation on the Ney: Turkey	1979	6586 039
XIII	Sources of European polyphony
XIII-1	Religious music of oral tradition from Rusiu, Corsica	1977	6586 033	D 8012 (1989)
XIV	Black Africa
XIV-1	Banda Polyphony	1976	6586 032	D 8043 (1992)	Recorded by Simha Arom.
	(unknown subsection)
	Aboriginal Music From Australia		6586 034	D 8040 (1992)
	Inuit Games and Songs	1978	6586 036	D 8032 (1991)	Review by Beverley Cavanagh in Ethnomusicology 25, #2 (May 1981), pp. 349–352, JSTOR 851295.
	Islamic Religious Chanting from North Yemen		6586 040
	Ainu Songs		6586 045	D 8047 (1993)	Review by Linda Fujie in Ethnomusicology 29, #1 (Winter 1985), pp. 132–133, JSTOR 852337.
