= Dattatreya Rama Rao Parvatikar =

Indian Hindu saint and sanyasi (1916-1990)

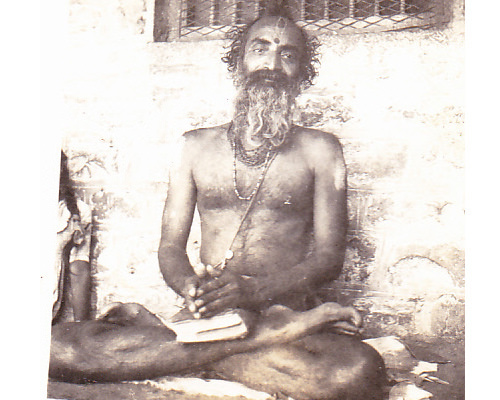
- Parvatikar
- Born: 1916; Guledgudda, Dist Bagalkot, Karnataka
- Died: 1990 (aged 73–74)
- Other names: veena baba, nadayogi, veenamaharaj

Dattatreya Rama Rao Parvatikar (Sanskrit: दत्तात्रेय राम राव् पर्वतिकर्, IPA: [dɐttaːtɽeːjɐ ɽaːmɐ ɽaːʋ pɐɽʋɐtɪkaːɽ]) [1916-1990], was a Hindu saint and sanyasi in India.

== Spiritual life ==
Dattatreya Parvatikar is a Deshastha Madhva Brahmin and follower of Madhva Sampradaya. He lived in the premises of Badrinath Temple of The Himalayas. He was fondly called veena baaba by his spiritual followers.

== Music ==
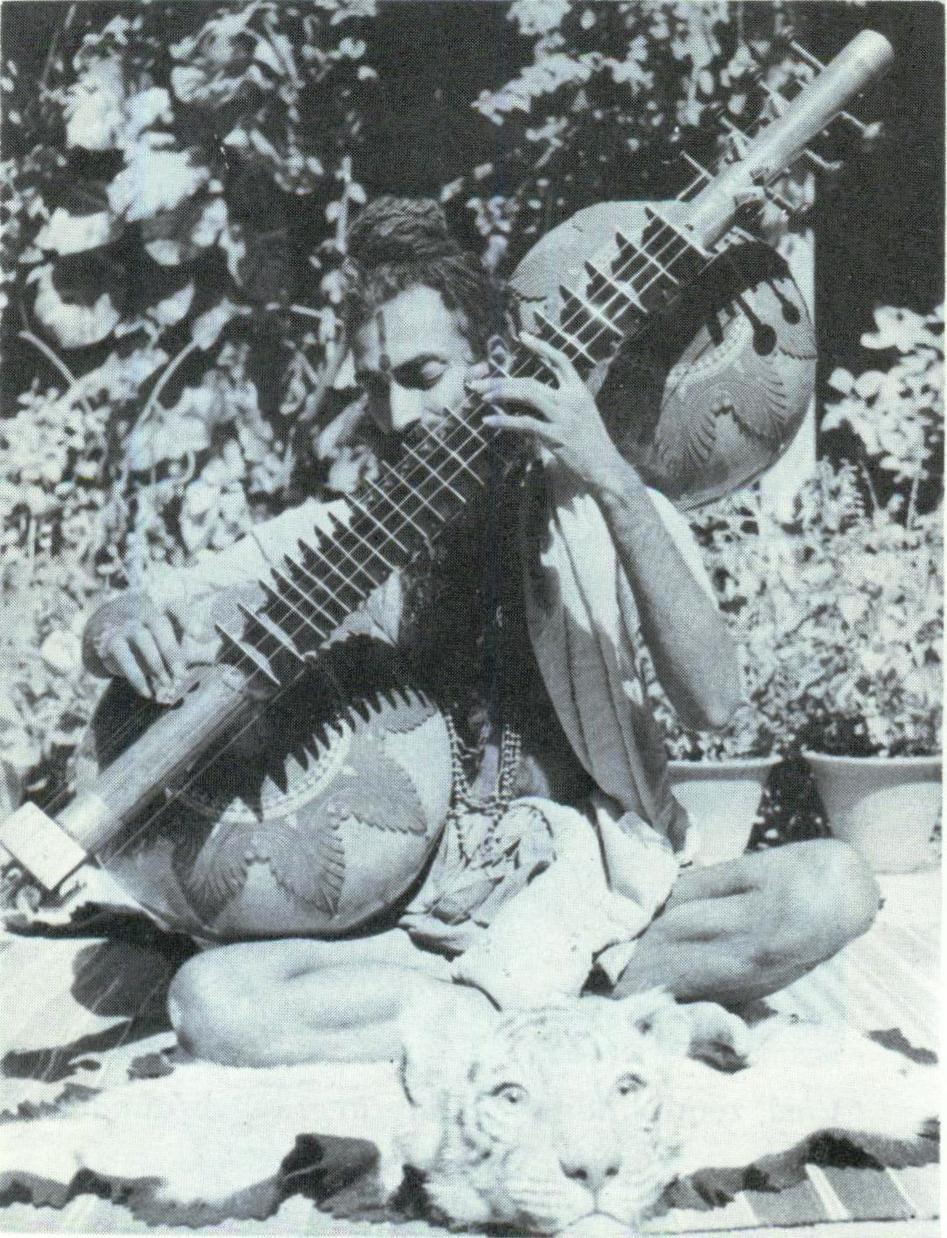
Dattatreya Parvatikar playing Rudra Veena

Parvatikar, an exponent of nada yoga, tried to spread spirituality through music.

He was keenly interested in Indian classical music and played the rudra veena. Alain Daniélou made recordings of his performances between 1950 and 1955. They are now part of a UNESCO project - UNESCO Collection of Traditional Music of the World. As a tribute to Alain Daniélou, UNESCO re-issued the album on 1997 as Anthology of Indian Classical Music – A Tribute to Alain Daniélou.

He started the Nada Yoga School in Rishikesh in 1950.

== Raghavendra mission ==
In 1975, Dattatreya Parvatikar founded the Shri Raghavendra Mission in Bangalore. In his memory, a music concert is held every year at Gayan Samaj Bangalore.
