= Graham Wiggins =

- Born: October 25, 1962; New York City, United States
- Died: September 7, 2016 (aged 53)
- Genres: World music
- Instrument: didgeridoo
- Label: Hannibal
- Formerly of: Dr. Didg; Outback
- Website: www.drdidg.com

Graham Wiggins (October 25, 1962 – September 7, 2016) was an American musician and scientist. He played the didgeridoo, keyboards, melodica, sampler, and various percussion instruments with his groups, the Oxford-based Outback and Dr. Didg. He also developed new technologies for magnetic resonance imaging (MRI).

== Early life and education ==
Graham Wiggins was born on 25 October 1962 in New York City, United States to an Australian mother and a British father from Abingdon, Oxfordshire, and grew up in New York.

e graduated from Paul D. Schreiber High School in Port Washington, New York in 1980.

Although his first instruments were piano and horn, he taught himself to play the didgeridoo while a physics student at Boston University in 1982, after hearing Warren Senders demonstrating a cardboard-tube didgeridoo as part of a "world music" concert series in Boston.

He graduated from Boston University in 1985, relocating to Oxford, England, UK, for postgraduate study. In order to earn extra money to complete his doctorate, he also performed as a busking didgeridoo player. He earned his nickname Dr. Didg while testing his didgeridoo in the Clarendon physics laboratory.

== Musical career ==
In 1983, Wiggins invented a keyed version of the didgeridoo, which allows it to be played melodically somewhat in the manner of an ophicleide, a keyed brass instrument which Wiggins was able to try at the Bate Collection, a musical instrument museum at Oxford University's Faculty of Music in St Aldate's, Oxford. The first prototype was made out of a cardboard wrapping paper tube and had first only one, then four valves, allowing the instrument to play a total of five distinct pitches. He used it in only one concert, after which it fell apart. He refined this model in 1990, using the machine tools at the Clarendon Laboratory at Oxford University. It is made from wengé (an African hardwood) with brass hardware. It has eight keys, which allows for the playing of nine different pitches. He unveiled it publicly for the first time on the British national television program called Tomorrow's World. The instrument may be heard on several Dr. Didg tracks, most notably "Sub Aqua," on the 2002 CD Dust Devils, as well as "Sun Tan," on the 1994 CD Out of the Woods.

While a graduate student at Oxford University, Wiggins played piano in the Jazz Liberation Front, a university-based quintet with Andy Williamson (sax), Ian Smith (trumpet), Steve Kershaw (bass) and Richard Gobbett (drums). In 1988, he formed the core of Outback with guitarist Martin Cradick, a band that blended Australian tribal sounds with modern music. He obtained a record deal before completing his thesis. Following the dissolution of that group in 1991, he spent two months in early 1992 living in the Aboriginal community of Galiwinku on Elcho Island, off the coast of Arnhem Land, in Australia's Northern Territory, where he studied the advanced traditional didgeridoo techniques of the area. With the exception of a few songs such as "Brolga," Wiggins' compositions are generally not based primarily on traditional Aboriginal structures, but instead on the use of the instrument's percussive, rhythmic, and melodic capabilities. In 1993, Wiggins formed the group Dr. Didg. In 1994, he began using the technique of live sampling, which became the foundation of the Dr. Didg album Out of the Woods.

Wiggins played with the Grateful Dead in 1993 at the Mardi Gras show at the Oakland Coliseum in California, and recorded with Mickey Hart on the albums Mickey Hart's Mystery Box and Supralingua as part of the Grammy Award-winning ensemble Planet Drum. After a few years hiatus, Dr. Didg began touring again in 2010, including performances at the All Good Music Festival at Marvin's Mountaintop in Masontown, West Virginia, and Meeting of the Minds III in Poyntelle, Pennsylvania.

After 15 years living in Oxford, Wiggins moved back to Boston in the spring of 2000.

== Scientific career ==
Wiggins held a D.Phil in solid-state physics from Oxford University. He worked as an engineer in the Athinoula A. Martinos Center for Biomedical Imaging at the Massachusetts General Hospital in Boston from 2003 to 2008. During this time, he helped to develop new technology for MRI scanners, including many-element detector arrays that enabled the acquisition of faster and sharper images.

In 2008, Wiggins moved to New York to become the director of Radiofrequency (RF) Engineering in the Department of Radiology at New York University (NYU) Grossman School of Medicine. The RF engineering group he led introduced various innovations in the design of MRI detectors and transmitters for a range of applications in research and clinical imaging.

Wiggins remained at NYU until his death, at age 53, in September of 2016.

== Discography ==
- 1990 – Baka – Outback (Hannibal)
- 1991 – Dance the Devil Away – Outback (Hannibal)
- 1995 – "Devon" (12" single) – Dr. Didg (Hannibal)
- 1995 – Devon – Dr. Didg (Hannibal)
- 1995 – Out of the Woods – Dr. Didg (Hannibal)
- 1996 – Mickey Hart's Mystery Box – Mickey Hart (Rykodisc)
- 1998 – Serotonality – Dr. Didg (Hannibal)
- 1998 – "Made Ya Mine" (single) – Dr. Didg (Hannibal)
- 1998 – Supralingua – Planet Drum (Rykodisc)
- 1999 – Live Jams – Dr. Didg (Home Grown)
- 2000 – Echoes of the Past – Graham Wiggins (Home Grown)
- 2001 – Live Jams 2000 – Dr. Didg (Home Grown)
- 2001 – As Above: Live at the Lizard Lounge (2-CD set) – Club D'Elf (Grapeshot Records/Live Archive)
- 2002 – Assorted – Dr. Didg (Home Grown)
- 2002 – Dust Devils – Dr. Didg (Narada)
- 2009 – This is Your Brain... – Dr. Didg (Home Grown)
- ? – Cross That Line – (Hannibal Ryko Gramavision music sampler)
