= Sue Hart =

Sue Hart (or similar) may refer to:

- Su Hart (born 1959), British musician
- Susanne Hart (1927–2010), South African conservationist
- Susan Hart (born 1941), American actress
