= Baka music =

Baka music is the music of the Baka people from the southwestern Central African Republic. Most Baka music is vocal and polyphonic. It is based on repetitive melody and rhythm, with few variations and consists of improvisation. Music and dance are important to them. They are used to prepare for a hunt or show a skill. Music is also used in daily life for healing rituals, initiation rituals, traditional stories, group names, and entertainment. Dance and music help bring groups together. This helps people become friends while they share their survival techniques.

== Dance ==
Every part of the forest has its own dance ritual. Many dances used for different things. They are performed by skilled dancers, who usually have gone through specific initiation. They are done for men initiations, healing, funerals, and keeping the community close together. In a dance, the dancers do structured improvisation. They know when and how to add or change a phrase or a beat.

== Vocal music ==
The most common voice technique is Jodel. It goes from the chest to the head. Jodel is often performed on syllables or sounds without any meaning. Using these chest and head voices, they are able to attain tone colors ranging from tense/raspy to relaxed/breathy.

== Instruments ==
Baka people use many things to make instruments. The earth to make an earth bow, the river to make water drums. Most of the instruments used by the Baka people come from the Bantu people. These instruments include the cylindrical drums, the arched harp, the harp-zither, lamellaphones, and some rattles. Other instruments include the flute, which is very common, water drums, and the instrument that is only played by women, the musical bow.

Molimo is the pygmie's trumpet like instrument. The molimo in the book, "The Forest People", by Colin Turnbull, is made out of metal pipe slightly bent in the middle. Molimos are also sometimes made out of wood or bamboo. Sacred instrument to the Baka, not the actual object but rather the sound it makes or imitates.

A molimo ceremony lasts two months and it follows an overall daily pattern. Collection of food offerings happens around mid day. After evening dinner the women and children go into huts for the night. Molimo is referred to as the " Animal of the forest". and the women are supposed to believe that it really was an animal, and that to see it would bring death. Men stay out sit around the molimo fire. They sing and from a distance the molimo plays in response, mimicking the sounds of the animals of the forest, answering to the singing. Along the molimo's way into the village, the player will stop at stream crossings to run water through the instrument or to "give it a drink". The molimos are eventually brought in to the village, played along with singing. Molimo passed through the flames of the molimo fire, coals rubbed on it, and placed in the end which get blown out by playing. Later, when the molimo leaves the men eat what was collected earlier that day.

== Compositions ==
"Makala"- a performance of "Mabo", is a type of music and dance related to net-hunting where the villagers create an entourage of novices and their expert singers/drummers while walking to another village. Throughout the performance they use the multiple versions of their drums to add to the percussive voices of the singers and their chanting/ yodeling. Their chants usually are produced from either the head or chest to create the high and low pitches sung throughout the Makala.

In an example of Makala, the first melodic line comes, which is what the song is loosely based on. This melodic line repeats in cyclic form and gives an underlying time line and harmonic structure to the composition. The melodic line might not even be voiced. Some people might add variations. Some might expound by freely outlining the melodic line, which is often done using parallel harmonies. If the singer is using the yodeling style, which is where women shine, she will often stress the end of the expression. Melodic lines that are an octave lower is often a men's section. When a dance starts, it is usually men and boys who take support sections. Once these support sections have been voiced, others follow in with the main melodic line. In time, most of the onlookers and dancers will join in by doubling sections or adding variations, which might make the main melodic line fall out entirely. All sections, except for the rhythm of the small drum, are substitutable and open to interpretation.
-Water Drums- Another way that only women and girls play music is to play with the river. A group of them will stand in the water up to their waists and with cupped hands hit the surface of the water. Each of them will play a diverse rhythmic pattern, which mutually forms a more multifaceted sound rhythm. The sound of this river drumming joined with their laughter bring happiness across the forest ****

== Community ==
For the most part, musical skills are acquired through enculturation. In critical times, the musical group needs the participation of every member. For instance, in Colin Turnbull's The Forest People, even when a man is ridiculed for setting his hunting net in front of the others' nets, he joins in the all-night singing and is forgiven. Even though group participation is extremely important, individuals may stand out as well. The community knows exactly who wrote which song, and where whole repertories originated from, such as Mabo, Togo. Sometimes the older of two groups does teach the younger, and also teaching between members of groups from different regions sometimes takes place.

== See also ==
- Baka Beyond
