= Raghunath Prasanna =

Indian classical musician

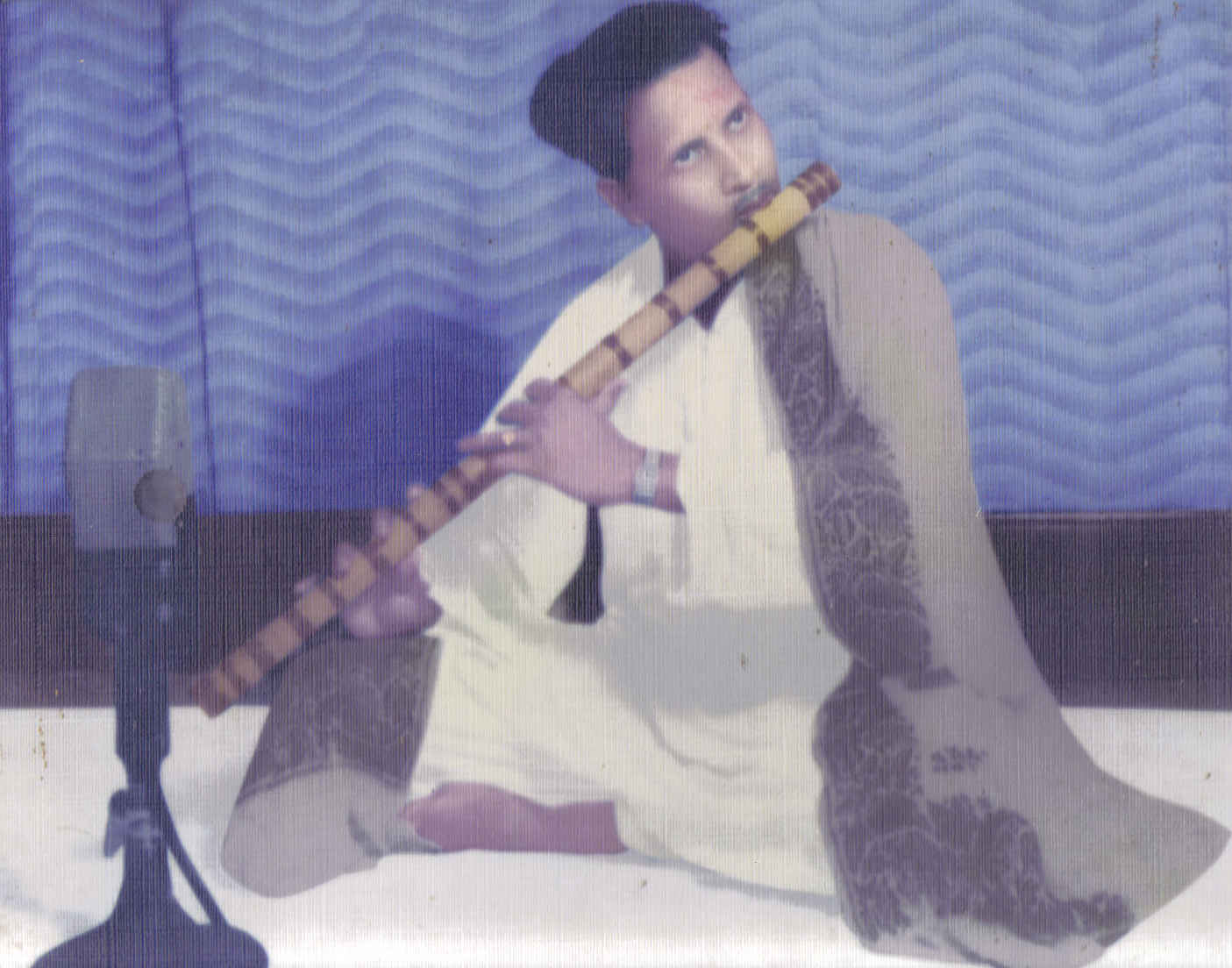
- Raghunath Prasanna at All India Radio in 1939

Background information
- Born: 1913
- Died: 1999 (aged 85–86)
- Genres: Indian classical music
- Occupation: Instrumentalist
- Instruments: Bansuri, shehnai

Pandit Raghunath Prasanna (1913–1999) was an Indian classical shehnai and bansuri player.

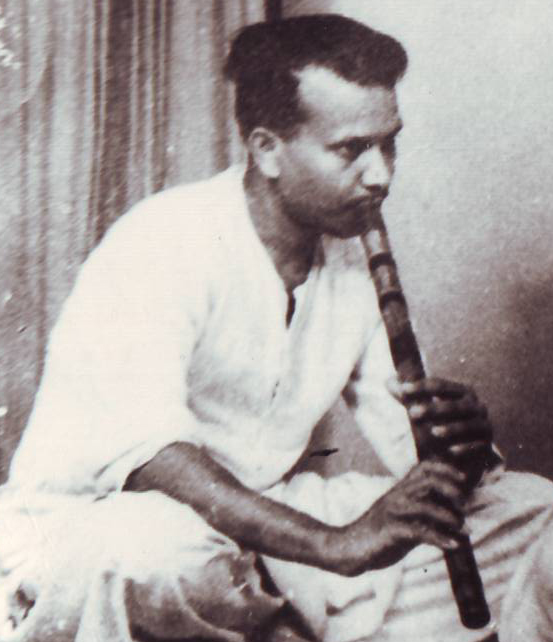
Raghunath Prasanna playing Tripura Bansuri in a concert

== Career ==
Raghunath Prasanna received his initial musical training from his father, Gauri Shanker, a shehnai player, and from Dauji Mishra of Varanasi.

His shehnai and bansuri performances were recorded by Alain Daniélou and included in the album Anthology of Indian Classical Music – A Tribute to Alain Daniélou (1955), a collection documenting Indian classical music traditions. The anthology includes recordings associated with major figures of Indian classical music, including Ravi Shankar, Ali Akbar Khan, and the Dagars
