= Unesco Collection: A Musical Anthology of the Orient =

Compilation album series

Unesco Collection: A Musical Anthology of the Orient is a series of recordings of traditional music that was made for the International Music Council by the International Institute for Comparative Music Studies and Documentation (Berlin/Venice) and released on the Musicaphon label by Bärenreiter (Kassel/Basel/London). The series was directed by Alain Daniélou.

It was part of the larger and longer enduring UNESCO Collection series.

== Recordings ==
- Laos — BM 30 L 2001

Reissued by Rounder as Anthology of world music: The music of Laos, CD 5119. Review by Terry E. Miller and Jarernchai Chonpairot: Asian Music 11, #1 (1979), pp. 124-139, JSTOR 833976. Review by Eugene Chadbourne on Allmusic, .

- Cambodia — BM 30 L 2002

Reviewed, along with Laos, by George P. Springer in Ethnomusicology 9, #3 (September 1965), pp. 337-340, JSTOR 850254.

- Afghanistan — BM 30 L 2003

Reissued by Rounder as Anthology of world music: The music of Afghanistan, CD 5121. Review by John Baily in Yearbook for Traditional Music 35 (2003), pp. 229-230, JSTOR 4149357. Review by Adam Greenberg on Allmusic, .

- Iran I, II — BM 30 L 2004, BM 30 L 2005

These two albums reissued by Rounder as Anthology of World Music: Iran, CD 5122/5123. Review by Hormoz Farhat: Ethnomusicology 6, #3 (Sep. 1962), pp. 239-241, JSTOR 924471; review by Richie Unterberger on Allmusic, . Also, the first five albums in the series (Laos through Iran II) are reviewed by L. E. R. P. in Journal of the International Folk Music Council 14 (1962), pp. 140-142, JSTOR 835655.

- India I, II, III, IV — BM 30 L 2006, BM 30 L 2007, BM 30 L 2018, BM 30 L 2021
- Tunisia — BM 30 L 2008
- Tibet I, II, III — BM 30 L 2009, BM 30 L 2010, BM 30 L 2011

These three albums reissued by Rounder as Anthology of World Music: Music of Tibetan Buddhism, CD 5129/5130/5131. Review by Wei Li in Yearbook for Traditional Music 32 (2000), pp. 239-241, JSTOR 3185295; review by Adam Greenberg on Allmusic, .

- Japan I, II, III, IV, V, VI — BM 30 L 2012, BM 30 L 2013, BM 30 L 2014, BM 30 L 2015, BM 30 L 2016, BM 30 L 2017

These six albums reviewed by W. Adriaansz in Ethnomusicology 12, #3 (September 1968), pp. 463-468, JSTOR 850046.

- Turkey I, II — BM 30 L 2019, BM 30 L 2020
- Vietnam I: The Tradition of Hue — BM 30 L 2022
- Vietnam II: The Music of South Viet-Nam —BM 30 L 2023

This album was reissued as Auvidis D 8070 (1996). Also, the two albums above were reissued by Rounder as Anthology of World Music: The music of Vietnam, CD 5140. Review of Vietnam I/II by W. Adriaansz: Ethnomusicology 16, #2 (May 1972), pp. 308-310, JSTOR 849733. Review by Adam Greenberg on Allmusic, .

- Azerbaijan I — BM 30 L 2024

Reissued by Rounder as Anthology of World Music: The music of Azerbaijan, CD 5142. Review by Adam Greenberg on Allmusic, .

- Georgia I — BM 30 L 2025
- Malaysia — BM 30 L 2026
- Morocco — BM 30 L 2027

Reissued by Rounder as Anthology of World Music: Music of Islam and Sufism in Morocco, CD 5145. Review by Adam Greenberg on Allmusic, .

- Kurdish music — BM 30 SL 2028
- Pakistan — BM 30 SL 2029

Reissued by Rounder as Anthology of World Music: The Music of Pakistan, CD 5147. Review by Peter Row in Ethnomusicology 25, #3 (September 1981), pp. 559-561, JSTOR 851578. Review by David Henderson in Yearbook for Traditional Music 36 (2004), pp. 193-194, JSTOR 20058813. Review by Adam Greenberg on Allmusic, .

- Lebanon I — BM 30 SL 2030

Reissued by Rounder as Anthology of world music: Lebanon, CD 5148. Review by Adam Greenberg on Allmusic, .

- Indonesia I — BM 30 L 2031
- China — BM 30 SL 2032

Reissued as Auvidis D 8071 (1996). Also reissued by Rounder as Anthology of World Music: China, CD 5150. Review by Han Kuo-Huang in Ethnomusicology 33, #3 (Autumn 1989), pp. 567-569, JSTOR 851791. Review by Adam Greenberg on Allmusic, .

== See also ==
- Anthology of Indian Classical Music - A Tribute to Alain Daniélou
- UNESCO Collection
