= Christian Poché =

French ethnomusicologist and critic (1938–2010)

- Born: 26 July 1938; Aleppo, Syria
- Died: 3 December 2010 (aged 72); Paris, France

Academic work
- Discipline: Ethnomusicologist
- Sub-discipline: Middle Eastern and African music
- Institutions: Institut du Monde Arabe

Christian Poché (26 July 1938 – 3 December 2010) was a French ethnomusicologist, music critic, radio producer who specialised in Middle Eastern and African music.

== Biography ==
Poché was born the son of an Austrian father in the Syrian city of Aleppo, a centre of traditional Arabic music, where he spent most of his life. He lived several years of his youth in Lebanon, where he held the position of General Secretary, and then director of the Jeunesses Musicales (Musical Youths) from 1961 to 1969. During this time he also worked for two years as a music critic for the Lebanese newspaper L'Orient-Le Jour. After studies of musical composition and musicology in Germany, he was appointed as researcher at the International Institute for Comparative Music Studies in Berlin and as co-editor of The World of Music magazine during the early 1970s.

A former member of the Institute of the Arab World in Paris, he is the author of books and articles on Near Eastern, Arabic and African traditional music styles, notably in encyclopedias such as the Encyclopédie de la musique, the Grove Dictionary of Musical Instruments and the Garland Encyclopaedia of World Music. He was also part of the scientific committee of the Ocora and UNESCO record collections. For several of his numerous editions of Near Eastern music, he was awarded the French Charles-Cros prize.

Among others, he produced audio recordings of the liturgical music of the Syriac Orthodox Church. Historically spread across communities in Antioch, Tur 'Abdin, Urfa, Mardin in modern Turkey, as well as in Aleppo and Qamishli in modern Syria, this Oriental Orthodox church uses the Syriac language, an Aramaic historical language similar to that spoken by Jesus Christ and the Apostles.

A producer at Radio France, Poché presented regular programmes of world music such as the Vocabulaire des musiques traditionnelles (Vocabulary of Traditional Music). Another of his radio programmes was broadcast on France Vivace called Sanza, and subsequently renamed Zambra.

Poché died on 3 December 2010 in Paris.

== Selected publications ==
- Wright, Owen; Poché, Christian; Shiloah, Amnon (2001). "Arab music". Grove Music Online. Oxford: Oxford University Press. doi:10.1093/gmo/9781561592630.article.01139. ISBN 978-1-56159-263-0. (subscription, Wikilibrary access, or UK public library membership required)
- Dictionnaire des musiques et des danses traditionnelles de la Méditerranée, Paris, Fayard, 2005, 409 p. ISBN 2-213-62096-2
- Musiques du monde arabe. Écoute et découverte, Paris, Institut du monde arabe, 1996, 67 p. and 1 CD ISBN 2-906062-66-9
- Les danses dans le monde arabe ou l'héritage des almées, sous la direction de Djamila Henni-Chebra et Christian Poché, Paris, Montréal, l'Harmattan, Collection « Musique et musicologie », 1996, 169 p. ISBN 2-7384-4350-8
- Musique arabo-andalouse, Paris, Cité de la Musique, Arles, Actes Sud, 1995, 155 p. et 1 CD ISBN 2742735046

=== Translation ===
- Amnon Shiloah, La musique dans le monde de l'islam, [Music in the World of Islam, 1995], translated from English by Christian Poché, Paris, Fayard, collection Les chemins de la musique), 2002, 405 p. ISBN 2-213-61201-3
