= Akazehe =

Burundian women's polyphonic, dialogic greeting ritual

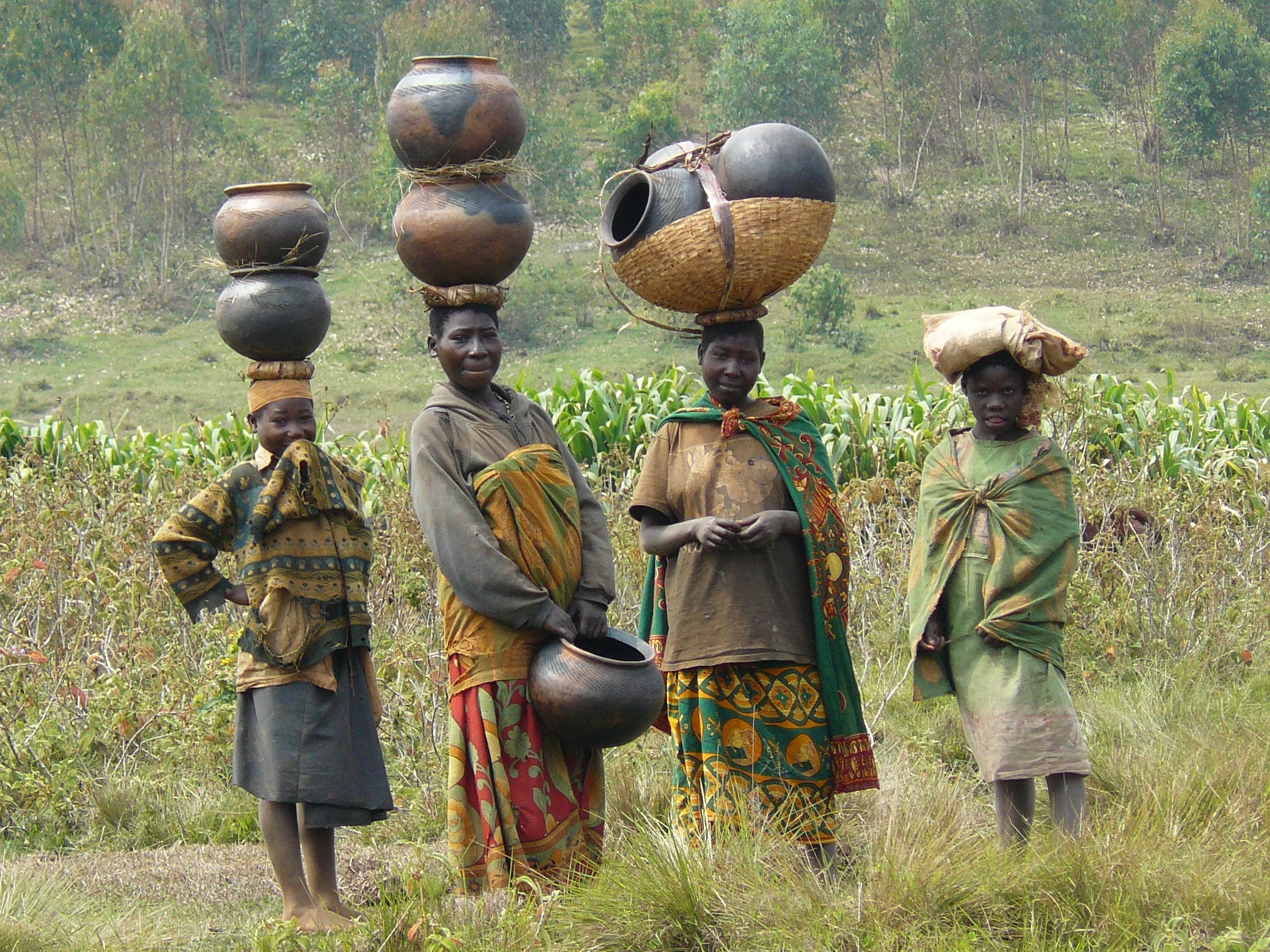
Rural Burundian women may greet each other with akazehe

A short sample audio recording of two young women performing akazehe in rapid interlocking rhythm. The full performance lasts several minutes.

Akazehe (Note: also spelled akazihi and akazêhé) (also known as agocoya or, regionally, akayégo (Note: Variant name used in the Buyogoma region. The root -yego is a sign of consent and it is used also in uruyego which means "scream out of joy".) or akahibongozo (Note: Also spelled agahibongozo. "means beautiful voice, beautiful melody, but also a success, a masterwork and it derives from the verb guhibongoza, that is, to perfect, to do something with elegance.")) is a traditional Burundian form of chanted extended musical greeting, sung exclusively by and between women. The polyphonic form is practiced among rural women as a quotidian greeting between pairs of friends or relatives, irrespective of time or occasion.

Within Burundi, akazehe is generally understood as conversational rather than musical, with the practice (whose name derives from the Kirundi root -zehe, meaning to chat) typically referred to in terms of speaking rather than of singing. The practice, noted for its promotion of peace and social cohesion in Burundi, is in decline.

== Ritual and musical structure ==
Akazehe begins with embrace, continues into extended dialogic chant, and ends with the squeezing or shaking of hands. The utterance is initiated by the older of the women.

Upon encounter, the female performers get close to one another and, standing up straight, place one or both arms on the forearm(s) or shoulder(s) of the other. The women's heads are next to each other, facing either the same or opposite directions, but never facing one another or meeting eyes. Once this posture is assumed, it is maintained without movement (except for, in some cases, "highly controlled" lip movement and caresses of the forearms and, less commonly, shoulders and face) throughout the chant, which may last for several minutes. The chant follows a call-and-response structure and accords to an interlocking rhythm, with one woman singing a melodic, variable part (called the gutera, meaning to throw), to the other woman's rhythmic ostinato response (called the kwakira, meaning to receive). The women obligatorily switch roles throughout the chant, timing the reversal(s) with brief pauses or with some conventional phrases. The verb for the exchange of roles is kwakiranwa, meaning to take turns in carrying the load. The rhythm of the akazehe is complex, with complete melodies forming from segments sung in rapid, overlapping enunciation, across a narrow range of notes. It has been compared in its tiluar rhythmic quality to a canon. When the women part at the end of the chant, they may now meet each other's eyes and smile, laugh, greet each other in other conventional ways (such as by shaking hands), and chat.

== Lyrical content ==
Formally, akazehe is characterized in its lyrics by such stylistic devices as allusion, metaphor, alliteration, and metonymy.

The lyrical contents of the chant can include expressions of complicity and affection, affirmations of the two performers' relative roles (e.g. Hello, hello my daughter; Yes, yes, yes my dear), exchanged news, advice, and personal stories about female domestic life, according to a ten-tiered hierarchy of thematic and sequential priority, as identified by Isaac Ndimurwakno:

1. Friendship among women
2. Women's domestic activity
3. Good feminine habits and ways of behaving
4. One's family of origin
5. The situation in the new family
6. The way of dressing
7. The new environment which is foreign
8. The new characters never encountered
9. The woman left alone working in the fields
10. Blessings and well wishes

The following is an example of an akazehe, transcribed by Italian ethnomusicologist Serena Facci:

Kirundi
English

Gutera: N’ako gusenya
Kwakira: Eh, shasa
G: N’ako kuvoma
K: Eh, shasa
G: N’ako gutega
K: Eh, shasa
G: Horaho, banzuze, sagamba, gwiza
K: Eh, shasa
G: ramuka
K: Eh, shasa
G: Horaho, banzuze
K: Eh, shasa
G: horaro ramuka
K: Eh, shasa
G: ukwanda, ndamwanka
K: Eh, shasa
G: Abandi bakobwa
K: Eh, shasa
G: barasi gusenya
K: Eh, shasa
G: Waruzi kuvoma
K: Eh, shasa
G: Waruzi gutega
K: Eh, shasa
G: Waruzi kugabura
K: Eh, shasa

Call: It is needed to look for wood
Response: What an elegance!
C: It is needed to draw water
R: What an elegance!
C: It is needed to cook
R: What an elegance!
C: Long life to you, come rather,
R: What an elegance!
C: [prosper, increase, arise]
R: What an elegance!
C: Long life to you, come rather,
R: What an elegance!
C: long life to you, arise
R: What an elegance!
C: He, who hates you, I hate
R: What an elegance!
C: The other girls know how to look
R: What an elegance!
C: for wood to burn
R: What an elegance!
C: Did you know how to draw water?
R: What an elegance!
C: Did you know how to cook?
R: What an elegance!
C: Did you know how to share?
R: What an elegance!

—Serena Facci (1996)
—Serena Facci (1996) and Alessandra Ciucci (2020)

== Society ==
Akazehe has been noted for fostering social connection and peace in times of conflict and instability. A 2014 study identified the practice as a source of well-being for conflict-affected women in Burundi.

Akazehe has been in decline since at least the 1990s. Akazehe as a practice disappeared from the Commune of Gishubi as a result of the Burundian Civil War between 1993 and 2000. Akazehe was reported in October 2024 by the Associated Press to be in decline. Cultural officials and teachers in Burundi attributed the decline to public health measures discouraging unnecessary physical contact during disease outbreaks such as COVID-19 and monkeypox, as well as a perceived lack of promotion in schools. "Among young Burundians," reports the Associated Press, "it is hard to find people who know what akazehe means and even harder to find someone who can perform it." School teacher Annonciate Baragahorana observed that akazehe was primarily practiced by women living in the central plateaus of the country, with the province of Ngozi specifically noted as a place where the tradition persists.

== See also ==
- Hindewhu – ludic Aka vocal-whistle rhythm
- Katajjaq – rhythmic Inuit vocal polyphony
- Round
