= The Meeting Pool =

Studio album by Baka Beyond
- Released: 1995
- Label: Hannibal

Baka Beyond chronology
| Spirit of the Forest (1993) | The Meeting Pool (1995) | Outback (1996) |

The Meeting Pool is an album by Baka Beyond, released in 1995. It was a collaboration between British musicians and the Cameroonian Baka. Martin Cradick, the founder and guitar player for the group, decided to make a second album after the success of the first, Spirit of the Forest.

The album sold more than 50,000 copies in its first year of release. Cradick set up a foundation to distribute royalties to the Baka people, for the songs that were considered traditional.

== Production ==
The album is based on field recordings made in Cameroon in 1994, with Baka percussionists and vocalists; Cradick then took the recordings to the studio. Cradick used more Celtic musical styles, compared to the first album.

== Critical reception ==
Professional ratings
Review scores
| Source | Rating |
|---|---|
| AllMusic | 3/5 stars |
| The Encyclopedia of Popular Music | 3/5 stars |
| MusicHound World: The Essential Album Guide | 3.5/5 stars |

The Toronto Star determined that the attempt "to merge gentle Celtic themes and original music of the Baka people of Cameroon's forests ... just doesn't work." The Santa Fe New Mexican stated: "Occasional Irish overtones emerge from this strange brew; the overall feeling is one of a pulsing dreaminess, grounded by a happy percussive underbeat given heart by recurring female vocal tonings." Music & Media called The Meeting Pool "a lush, complex and richly rewarding album," noting the "beautiful melodies and haunting rhythms."

AllMusic wrote that "Meeting Pool has moments of real piquancy, as on 'Ohureo', a traditional from the Western Isles of Scotland... This macabre lullaby, dressed up with African drums and [Paddy] LeMercier's fiddle commentary, is achingly entrancing." World Music: Africa, Europe and the Middle East deemed the album "a truly inspired cultural mish mash that defies categorisation."

== Track listing ==
| No. | Title | Length |
|---|---|---|
| 1. | "Woosi" |
| 2. | "Ancestor's Voice" |
| 3. | "Lupé" |
| 4. | "Ohureo" |
| 5. | "Meeting of Tribes" |
| 6. | "Journey" |
| 7. | "Ndaweh's Dream" |
| 8. | "Booma Lena" |
