= Yelli =

Song
- Language: Cameroonian

Yelli is the polyphonic yodeling song of Baka women in the Cameroon rainforests. It is sung early in the morning.

== See also ==
- Baka Beyond
