= Rinky Dink (sound system) =

Mobile musical sound system

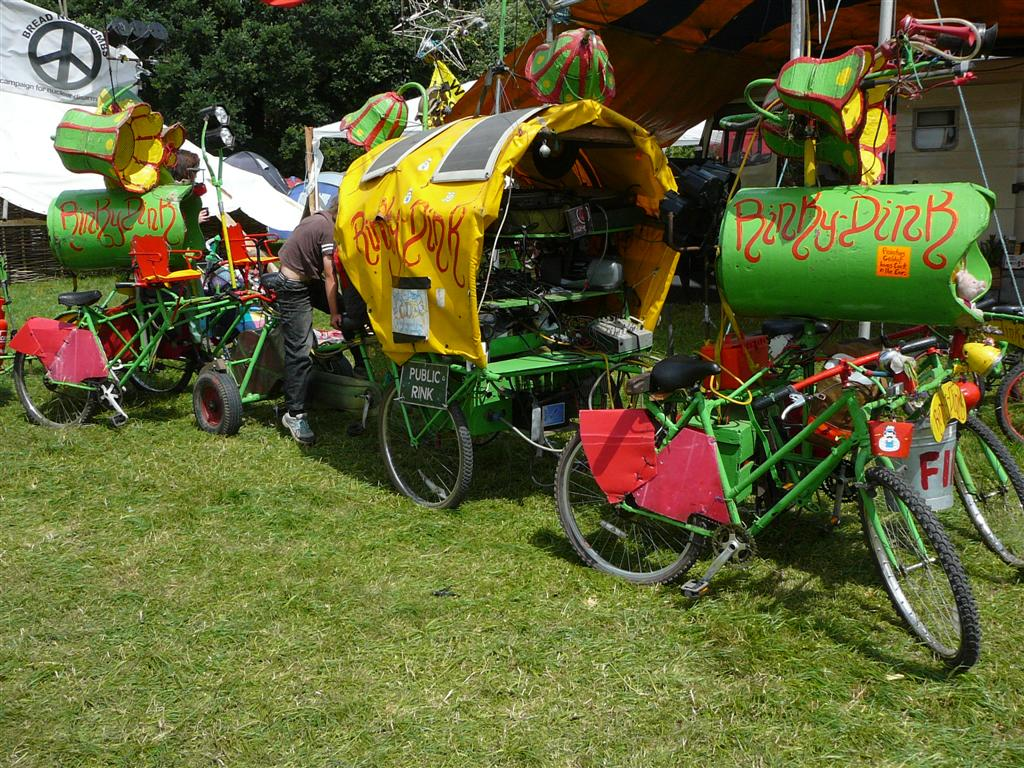
Rinky Dink Soundsystem at the Glastonbury Festival 2008

Rinky Dink is a mobile musical sound system that operates on power provided by two bicycles and solar panels. The sound system tours the world as part of many musical festivals and parties.

As well as being powered by bicycle, the system itself is moved around using specially converted bicycles. Rinky Dink is an example of how green electricity can be generated and used to power things.

The Rinky Dink was responsible for powering the first bicycle-powered digital recording in history—Live & Pedal-Powered (1995) by Baka Beyond.

The system was named after the American slang expression "rinky-dink", which originally meant "rip-off", but came to mean anything that was poorly put together, amateurish, shoddy, cheap or insignificant.
