= Raymond Burnier =

Swiss photographer (1912–1968)

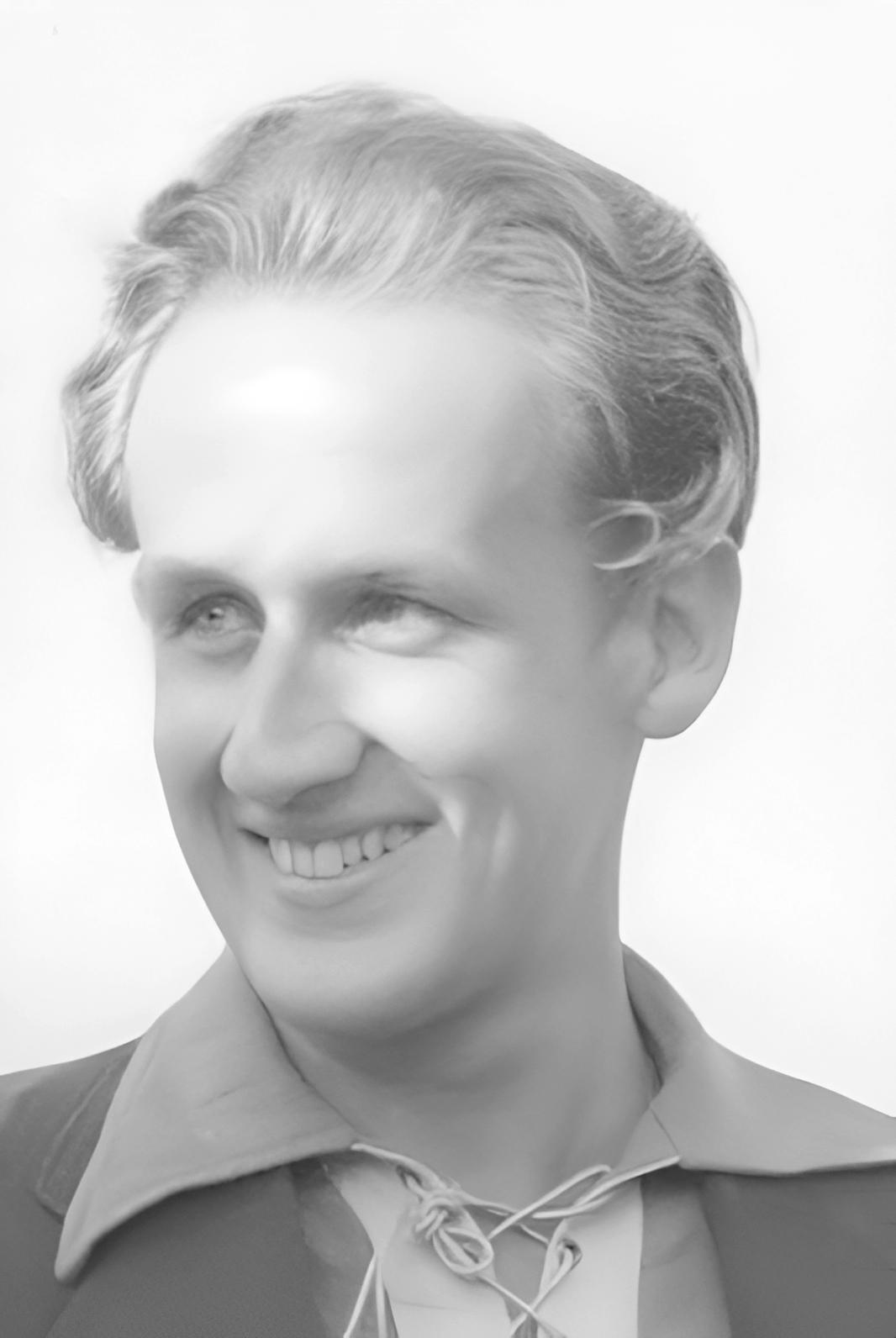
- Born: 6 July 1912; Lausanne, Switzerland
- Died: 29 September 1968 (aged 56); Zagarolo, Italy
- Occupation: Photographer
- Partner: Alain Daniélou
- Writing career
- Subject: Photography

Raymond Burnier (6 July 1912 – 29 September 1968) was a Swiss photographer born in Lausanne.

== Early life ==
Burnier was born in a wealthy Swiss family, his grandfather was among the inventor of the condensed milk, later commercialized by Nestlé. Most of his childhood was spent in a farm in Algeria.

== Career ==
A follower of the Leica, he was interested in Hindu sculpture from the medieval period (9th to 14th centuries). He revealed the beauty of the great temples of Khajuraho Group of Monuments, Bhubaneswar and Konark Sun Temple. He became a member of the Indian archaeological services and photographed a large number of sites and temples in central India.

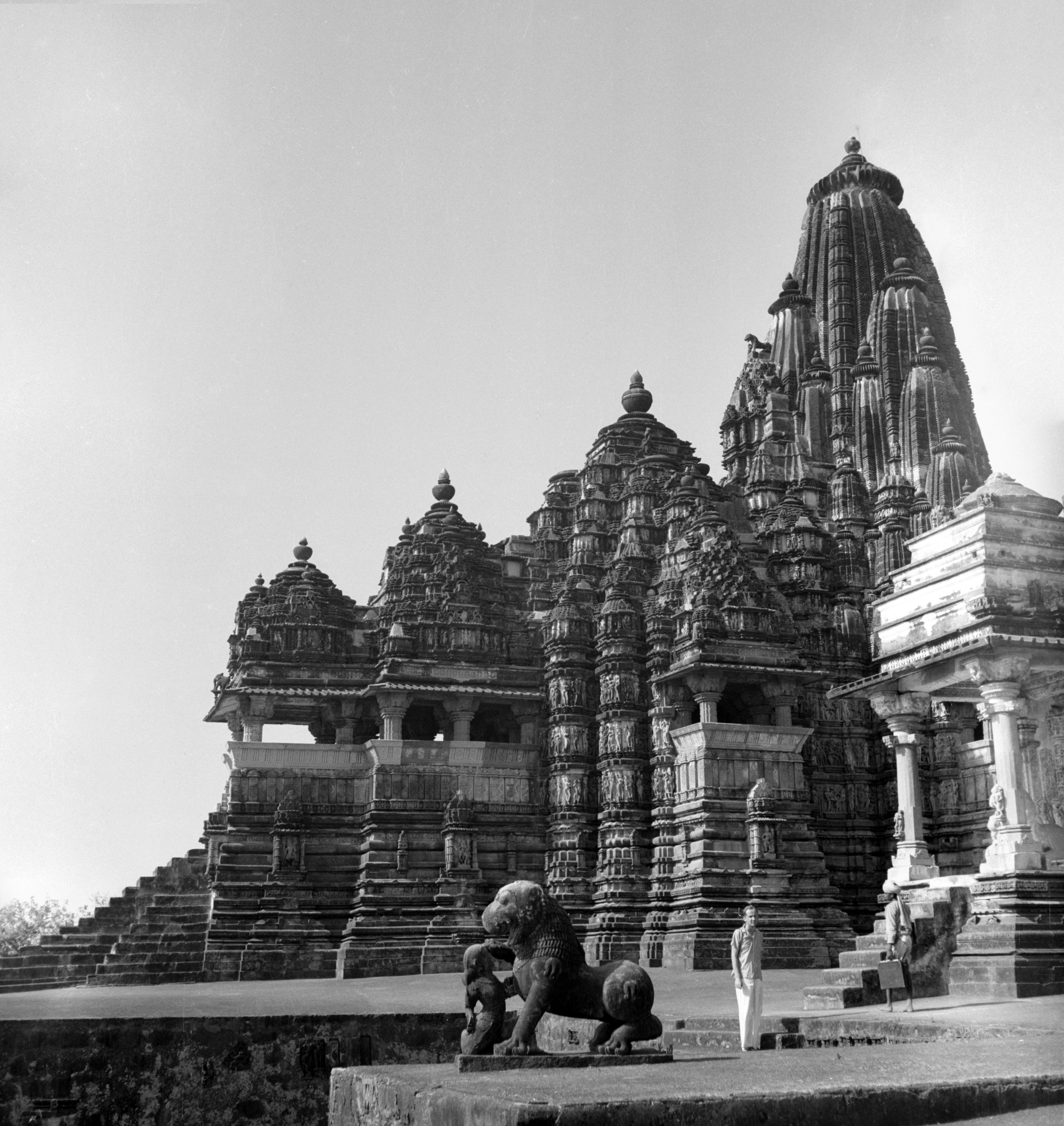
Vishvanatha Temple, Khajurâho, Inde.

To be able to travel to the isolated regions of this country, Raymond Burnier and his companion, Alain Daniélou, brought a caravan from California and built scaffolding to clean the walls of the temples, sometimes oiling the stones to better showcase the sculptures.

Raymond Burnier was the first to reveal to the West the beauty of these great temples and to immortalise the erotic sculptures that adorned them. At the time, apart from the difficulties of access, very few people were interested.

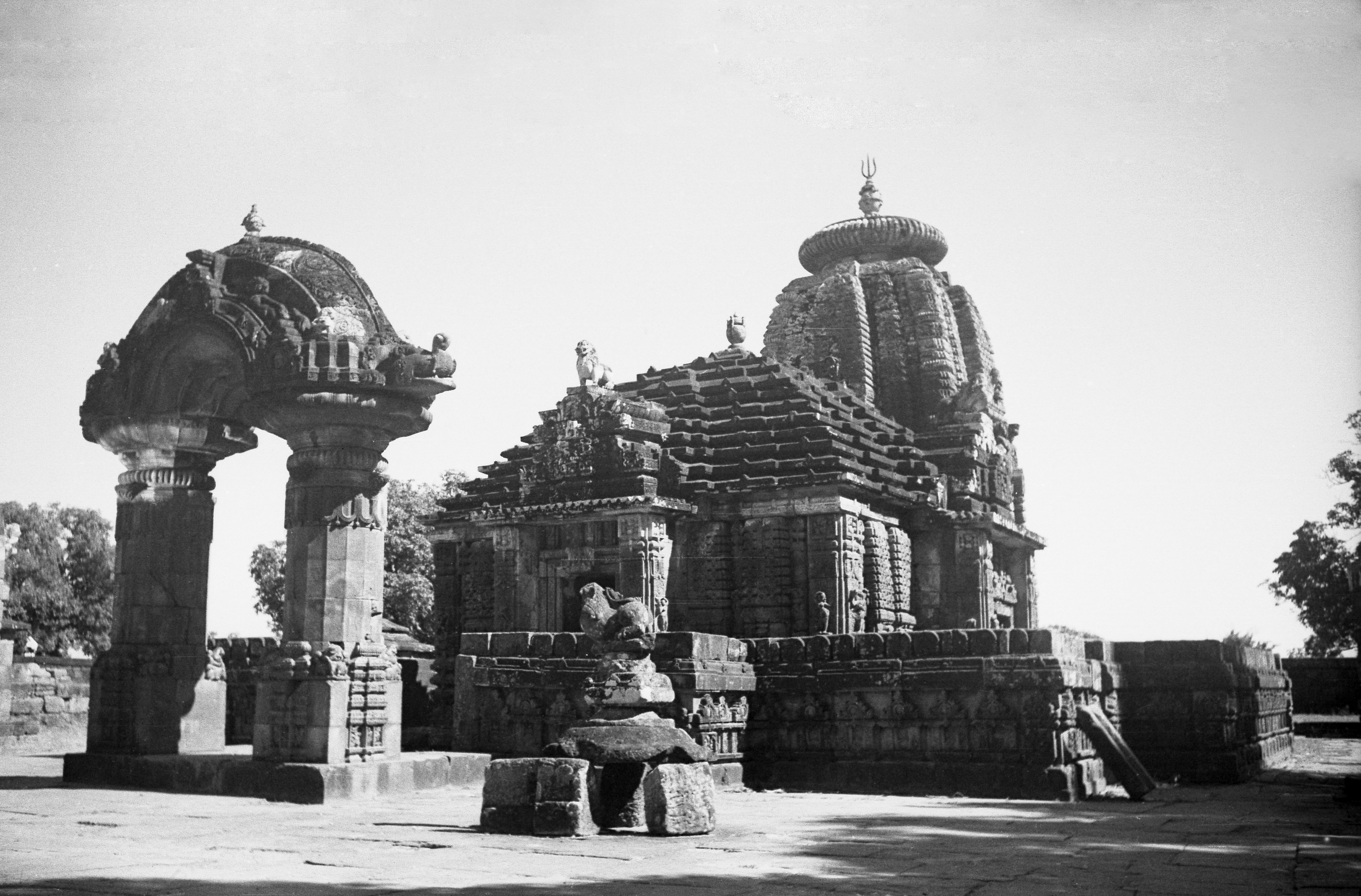
TMukteshvara Temple, Bhubaneswar, Inde.

Returning to Europe in 1958, Raymond Burnier took part in the creation of the International Institute for Comparative Studies in Music, founded by Alain Daniélou in Berlin and Venice, of which he was Secretary General until his death in 1968 in Zagarolo near Rome.

Influenced by the work of Cecil Beaton (that he receives in India), he inspired photographer Angelo Frontoni (it) (1929-2002).

== Personal life ==
In 1931 in Cote D'Azur he met Alain Danielou who would remain his lifelong companion, even if in the middle of their relationship Burnier married Radha Sri Ram.

After visiting Afghanistan they decided in 1936 to travel around the world, visiting China, Japan, Indonesia, the United States and then India, where they settled in 1938, fascinated by this civilisation.

They will stay in Benares in the Rewa palace on the banks of the Ganges. They lived there for nearly fifteen years, studying culture and civilisation with the city's scholars, Sanskrit and Hindi, and adopting the Hindu religion to which they were initiated. Alain Daniélou took the name of Shiva Sharan, Shiva's protégé, while Raymond Burnier took the name of Har Sharan, the liberator's protégé.

== Exhibitions ==
- Center Alain Daniélou, Zagarolo, Rome (more than 8,000 negatives realized between 1935 and 1955).
- In 1949 he was the first photographer exhibited at Museum of Modern Art, New York (prints made by Burnier)
- Museum of the Elysee, Lausanne.

== Works ==
- Burnier illustrated among others the books L'Erotisme Divinisé, The Hindu Temple: Deification of Eroticism, Visages de l'Inde médiévale, L'Inde traditionnelle. Photographies, 1935-1955, in which Alain Daniélou, who discovered through Tantrism and Shivaism a spirituality that recognizes art as much as sexuality, opens readers up to the metaphysics of eroticism as experienced and represented in the sacred art and literature of India.
- Exploring India's Sacred Art: Selected Writings of Stella Kramrisch
- Alain Daniélou and Raymond Burnier, Faces of medieval India, Paris, Hermann, 1985, 79 original photographs
