= Outback (group) =

World music group

- Origin: Oxford, England
- Genres: Aboriginal
- Years active: 1988–1992
- Label: Hannibal
- Spinoffs: Baka Beyond
- Past members: Martin Cradick; Graham Wiggins; Sagar N'Gom; Ian Campbell; Paddy Le Mercier

Outback were a world music group founded in the late 1980s by multi-instrumentalists Graham Wiggins and Martin Cradick. The group fused traditional Australian tribal music, represented primarily through Wiggins's didgeridoo, with modern Western music, mostly Cradick's steel-string guitar. Before the band dissolved in 1992, it had been joined by Senegalese percussionist Sagar N'Gom, French violinist Paddy Le Mercier and drummer Ian Campbell.

== Biography ==
Outback were formed when Martin Cradick (guitar, mandolin, African drums, shaker) and Graham Wiggins (didgeridoo, melodica) met in Oxford in 1988. The duo performed throughout England and released a five-track extended play, Didgeridoo and Guitar, on cassette which was recorded in October and November of that year. Four tracks were recorded and engineered by John Duggan while a live track, "Didgeridelay", was recorded at Balliol College by Michael Gerzon; the EP appeared via March Hare Music.

Their first album, Baka, was self-financed, named for a pygmy tribe from Cameroon, and released in 1990 on Hannibal Records.

Their first album meeting international success, the duo was able to add Senegalese Sagar N'Gom with his West African percussions and Ian Campbell on the drums. The unusual band would only live for a short time though, producing only one second and final album, Dance the Devil Away, where they were joined by French fiddler Paddy LeMercier.

The band dissolved in 1992. Martin Cradick and his wife Su Hart soon founded the group Baka Beyond, which would later be joined by N'Gom and LeMercier. Graham Wiggins on the other hand founded Dr Didg with Ian Campbell and guitarist Mark Revell.

== Members ==
- Martin Cradick (Guitar, mandolin, darbuka, bendir, luthar, jengu, Shaker)
- Graham Wiggins (Didgeridoo, melodica)
- Sagar N'Gom (Djembe, mbala, tama)
- Ian Campbell (Drum kit)
- Paddy Le Mercier (violin)

== Discography ==
- 1988: Didgeridoo and Guitar
- 1990: Baka
- 1991: Dance the Devil Away

== See also ==
- Baka Beyond
