= The River (1951 film) =

1951 film by Jean Renoir

- French film poster
- Directed by: Jean Renoir
- Written by: Rumer Godden; Jean Renoir
- Based on: The River by Rumer Godden
- Produced by: Kenneth McEldowney
- Starring: Nora Swinburne; Esmond Knight; Arthur Shields; Suprova Mukerjee; Thomas E. Breen; Patricia Walters; Radha Burnier; Adrienne Corri
- Narrated by: June Hillman
- Cinematography: Claude Renoir
- Edited by: George Gale
- Music by: M. A. Partha Sarathy
- Production company: Oriental International Films
- Distributed by: United Artists
- Release date: 10 September 1951
- Running time: 99 minutes
- Countries: France; USA
- Languages: English; Bengali
- Box office: $1 million (US rentals)

The River (French: Le Fleuve) is a 1951 Technicolor drama romance film directed by Jean Renoir and produced by Kenneth McEldowney. The cast includes Esmond Knight, Nora Swinburne and Arthur Shields. A fairly faithful dramatization of the 1946 novel of the same name by Rumer Godden, the film's narrative follows a teenage girl's coming of age and first love, with the eponymous river serving as both the backdrop and a central metaphor. The film was shot in Calcutta, India, where Indian filmmaker Satyajit Ray, who was then only a student of cinema, was able to meet Renoir for guidance.

== Plot ==
Harriet is an upper-middle class English teenage girl who lives with her family on the banks of the Ganges River in British India. (Note: The time setting is not specified. The Raj had ended by the time of the film's release, but the book was written in 1946. Harriet's character narrates the action as an older woman looking back on her earlier experiences.) Her father runs a jute mill, and she has four sisters and one brother, all of whom are at least several years younger than her. The children are raised in a genteel, English environment, and even have the benefit of live-in Indian employees, such as "Nan", their nanny.

The normal order of Harriet's life is shaken when her kindly Irish neighbor, Mr. John, invites his younger American cousin, Captain John, to come for a visit. When he arrives, the children discover Captain John has a prosthetic leg, having lost a leg in a war. Harriet, her sisters, and Harriet's somewhat older friend, Valerie, are all immediately intrigued by, and then smitten with, Captain John, and therefore invite him to their Diwali celebration. Eventually, Harriet gains the courage to show him her "secret book"—her diary. He politely acquiesces, but is then impressed by her poetry.

Later, eager to impress Captain John with her familiarity with the Hindu religion, or perhaps to divert his attention from Valerie, Harriet tells him a marriage story she has written, in which the mundane identities of ordinary peasants are subject to divine change and transformation. In the tale, Lord Krishna intervenes in a wedding ceremony to assume the identity of the groom, and a bride is temporarily transformed into Lady Radha, Krishna's consort, who does an extended dance. After Harriet's story, Valerie steals the diary and reads lovelorn passages of it aloud in front of Captain John, greatly embarrassing Harriet.

Another of Harriet's friends is Melanie, the twenty-ish, bi-racial daughter from Mr. John's marriage to a now-deceased Indian woman. She also seems to be interested in Captain John, but pursues him less obviously than do Harriet or Valerie. Captain John and Melanie bond over discussing their experiences struggling with wartime injury and being bi-racial, respectively.

Bogey, Harriet's young brother, develops an obsession with cobras after watching a snake charmer in the market. Harriet sees him playing a flute to a cobra in their garden one day and commands him to inform their parents of the dangerous snake's presence, but she does not tell them herself because she is delivering some flowers to Captain John. She sees Melanie leave Mr. John's house, followed by Captain John, and follows them. Melanie loses Captain John in the woods, but then Valerie, who has been following Harriet, goes over to him, and they end up sharing a passionate kiss, witnessed from afar by Harriet and Melanie. Bogey's body is found soon after, bitten by the cobra.

Overcome with jealousy and wracked with guilt over Bogey's death, Harriet loses the will to live. She runs away from home the night after the funeral and attempts to drown herself by taking an unattended boat out into the middle of the river and stepping overboard, but Bogey's friend Kanu alerts some local fishermen, who rescue her from the water. Once back ashore, Harriet refuses to return to her family, but Kanu gets Captain John, and he is able to ease her mind. He kisses her on the forehead, and she allows him to take her home.

In the spring, Harriet's mother gives birth to another baby girl. While they wait until they can go inside and meet her, Harriet, Valerie, and Melanie look at the river and take a moment to reflect on the cycles of life and death that take place on its banks.

== Cast ==
- Nora Swinburne as The Mother
- Esmond Knight as The Father
- Arthur Shields as Mr. John, a neighbor
- Suprova Mukerjee as "Nan", the children's nanny
- Thomas E. Breen as Capt. John, Mr. John's younger cousin
- Patricia Walters as Harriet
  - June Tripp (credited as June Hillman) as the narrator, who is Harriet as an adult
- Radha Burnier as Melanie, Mr. John's half-Indian daughter
- Adrienne Corri as Valerie, the daughter of the owner of the jute press

Uncredited

- Richard R. Foster as Bogey
- Penelope Wilkinson as Elizabeth
- Jane Harris as Muffie
- Jennifer Harris as Mouse
- Cecilia Wood as Victoria
- Sajjan Singh as Ram Singh, the gateman
- Nimai Barik as Kanu, Bogey's friend
- Trilak Jetley as Anil, Mr. John's friend and Melanie's suitor

== Production ==
J. Kenneth McEldowney was the originating producer and primary organizing figure behind The River. After criticizing an MGM film, he accepted a dare from his wife, an MGM publicist, to make a better one. He sold their home and his chain of florist shops and, between 1947 and 1951, independently financed and oversaw the production of The River. The movie was produced by McEldowney with a largely amateur or little-known cast, while Godden wrote the screenplay and Renoir was engaged as director. Both Renoir and McEldowney had previously read Rumer Godden’s novel.

As the film was shot in Technicolor, the footage could not be reviewed in color until it came back from the lab five months later, things had to be done right the first time.

Renoir made use of nonprofessional actors in key roles, including those of Harriet and Captain John. Thomas E. Breen was a veteran of the United States Marine Corps who was injured during fighting on Guam in 1944, resulting in the amputation of his right leg. Renoir selected him to play the role of Captain John without knowing he was the son of Joseph Breen, head of the Motion Picture Producers and Distributors of America, who was the chief censor of films in the U.S.

The future Indian filmmaker Satyajit Ray, who was then working in advertising, met Renoir while The River was in production, and the two men became close. During filming Ray met Subrata Mitra, a production assistant on this film and later the cinematographer for several of Ray's films. The film's assistant director was Harisadhan Dasgupta, and the assistant art director was Bangshi Chandra Gupta.

== Awards, responses and preservation ==
McEldowney’s wife secured substantial publicity in major magazines such as Life and the Saturday Evening Post, contributing to the film’s commercial and critical success, including a record 34-week run in New York and worldwide earnings reported at more than $16 million. Having achieved his goal of producing a successful film, McEldowney returned to real estate and did not make another motion picture.

At the 12th Venice International Film Festival, The River won the International Award. The National Board of Review in the United States selected it as one of the five Top Foreign Films of 1951.

Roger Ebert added the film to his "Great Movies" list in 2006.

The Academy Film Archive, in conjunction with the British Film Institute, preserved the film in 2004.

== Influence ==
At the 2007 New York Film Festival, director Wes Anderson, a great fan of Jean Renoir, discussed Martin Scorsese showing him a print of The River, which is one of Scorsese's favourite films. Anderson credited this film, in addition to the films of Satyajit Ray and Louis Malle's documentaries about India, with inspiring him to make a film in India, resulting in The Darjeeling Limited (2007).
