= Radha Burnier =

Indian actress (1923–2013)

Radha Burnier (née Sri Ram; 15 November 1923 – 31 October 2013) was born in Adyar, India. She was president of the Theosophical Society Adyar from 1980 until her death in 2013. She was General Secretary of the Indian Section of the Society between 1960 and 1978, and was previously an actress in Indian films and Jean Renoir's The River.

== Biography ==
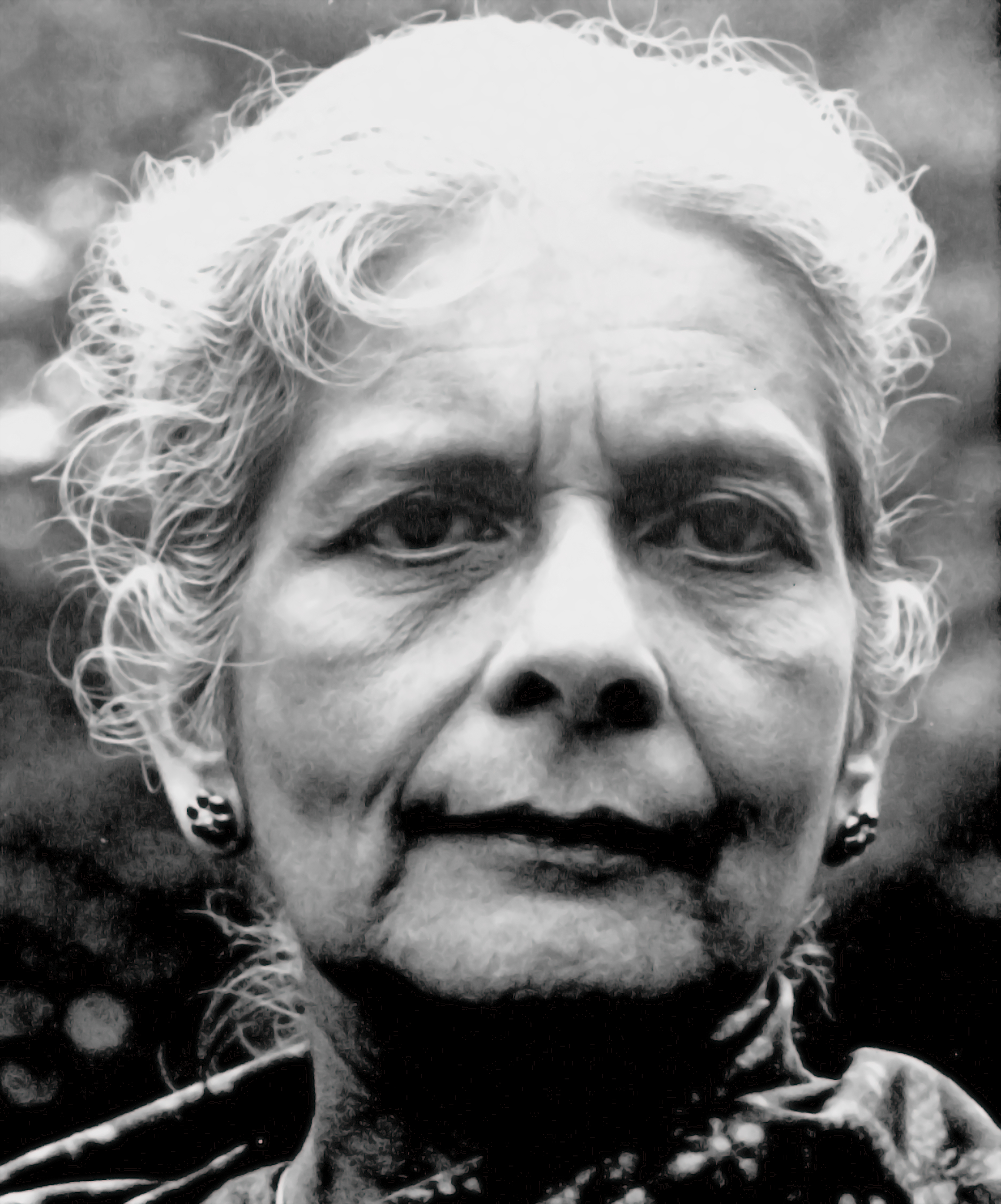
Radha Burnier at the International Theosophical Centre in Naarden, the Netherlands

Radha Burnier was the daughter of Nilakanta Sri Ram (who was the fifth President of the T.S. Adyar as well) and Srimati Bhagirathi. Shrimati Radha was educated in Theosophical schools and was a student in Rukmini Devi Arundale's school of classical Indian dance (the Kalakshetra Foundation). She attended the Benares Hindu University from which she obtained a B.A. with distinction and an M.A. on Sanskrit, standing first in that University. She played a pivotal role in Jean Renoir's 1951 film The River (Le Fleuve) and appeared in Indian films, billed simply as "Radha."

She joined the Theosophical Society in 1935 and was president of youth and adult Lodges for several years. She was President of the Madras Theosophical Federation (1959–63) and librarian and worker at the Indian Section Headquarters of the TS (1945–51). She had been a member of the General Council of the TS (Adyar) since 1960, and had been in its executive committee, finance committee and Theosophical Publishing House Council for many years. She lectured extensively around the world on a regular basis from 1960 and was a guest speaker at many conventions, congresses and summer schools. Radha Burnier presided over three World Congresses of the Theosophical Society: 1982 in Nairobi, Kenya; 1993 in Brasília, Brazil, and 2001 in Sydney, Australia. In July 1990 she conducted two well-attended seminars on "Human Regeneration" at the International Theosophical Centre in Naarden, The Netherlands, which included participants from many countries. In one of the sessions, speaking on "Regeneration and the Objects of the T.S.", she said: "Universal brotherhood, the realization of a mind in which there is no prejudice whatsoever, no barrier against anything, is regeneration, because such a consciousness is totally different from the ordinary consciousness." She was the author of numerous articles in The Theosophist, of which she was the editor since 1980, and other Theosophical journals. She had supervised and directed the work of the Adyar Library and Research Centre since 1954 and was the editor of the Library's research journals and publications. Radha also translated Sanskrit works for publication.

Radha Burnier was the Head of the Krotona Institute of Theosophy in Ojai, California; The Manor Centre in Sydney; and President of the International Theosophical Centre in Naarden, Holland. She was president of the Olcott Education Society, The Theosophical Order of Service (founded by Annie Besant in 1908), the Besant Education Fellowship and she founded The New Life for India Movement (1968), which promotes right citizenship, right values and right means among Indians. She had been a member of "Le Droit Humain" and became the founder and head of the Eastern Order of International Co-Freemasonry. She was also a close associate of Jiddu Krishnamurti and was a Trustee of the Krishnamurti Foundation India. On 4 November 1980, at her invitation, Krishnamurti visited Adyar after an absence of 47 years. He walked with her and a number of residents from the main gate of the compound to the seashore and visited the beach where he was discovered, in 1909, by C. W. Leadbeater. Two years later, in December 1982, during the Adyar Centenary Convention of the TS, Krishnamurti planted a Bodhi tree at Adyar.

Radha Burnier died at her home at Adyar on 31 October 2013, at 9.00 pm, following a heart attack. She was cremated at the Besant Nagar Crematorium, Chennai, and her ashes were placed in the Garden of Remembrance at the TS international Headquarters at Adyar, on the spot also occupied by her father's (N. Sri Ram) ashes.

== Personal life ==
Radha Burnier was married to Raymond Burnier, a Swiss photographer, who came to India in 1932. She died in 2013, at age 90, in Chennai after a prolonged illness.

== Works ==
- Human regeneration, lectures and discussions. Theosophical Publishing House, Wheaton 1991; ISBN 81-7059-169-4
- No Other Path to Go. Theosophical Publishing House, Wheaton 1985; ISBN 0-8356-7578-5
- The Way of Self-Knowledge. Theosophical Publishing House, Wheaton 1993; ISBN 81-7059-216-X
- Truth, Beauty, and Goodness. Theosophical Publishing House, Wheaton 1985; ISBN 0-8356-7576-9
