= Anthology of Indian Classical Music – A Tribute to Alain Daniélou =

The Anthology of Indian Classical Music – A Tribute to Alain Danielou

Live album by Alain Danielou
- Released: 1997
- Recorded: 1950–1955
- Genre: Indian classical music
- Length: 2:45:42
- Label: AUVIDIS/UNESCO, D-8270
- Producer: UNESCO

The Anthology of Indian Classical Music – A Tribute to Alain Daniélou is the 1997 edition of Alain Danielou's Anthology of Indian Classical Music.

== Background ==
This collection was originally recorded by Alain Danielou for the International Music Council (UNESCO) between 1950 and 1955, and was published in 1966. As a tribute to Alain Daniélou, UNESCO re-issued the album on 1997 as Anthology of Indian Classical Music - A Tribute to Alain Daniélou. The introductory text is by Serge Moreux.

== Musical style, writing, composition ==
The album contains Indian classical music performances by some of the prominent Indian musicians at that time.

== Artwork, packaging ==
The album comes as a three CD compilation.

== Accolades ==
The series received the "Diapason d'Or" award and the "Grand Prix du Disque" in 1998.

== Track listing ==
=== Disc 1 ===
1. Le Mode Bhairavi (Raghunath Prasanna, Durga Prasanna, Katvaru Lal) - 3:17
2. Khyal (Mohin Ud Din Dagar, Amin Ud Din Dagar) - 6:24
3. Le Mode Ahiri-Lalita (Ravi Shankar) - 5:40
4. Le Mode Malkosh ( Mishra Shyam Lal & D.K. Chatterji) -5:56
5. Le Mode Todî (Narayan Das Mishra & Mishra Shyam Lal ) - 3:39
6. Gat (Svami D.R. Parvatikar) - 3:12
7. Tabla Solo (Chaturial) - 3:26
8. Sitar, Sarode Et Tabla (Ravi Shankar, Ali Akbar Khan & Chaturial) - 13:51
9. Alap (Mohin Ud Din Dagar & Amin Ud Din Dagar) - 3:49
10. Le Mode Sindhi-Bhairavi (Ali Akbar Khan) - 5:01

=== Disc 2 ===
1. Thumri (Raghunath Prasanna & Motilal) - 3:21
2. Svara Mandala (Svami D.R. Parvatikar) - 3:10
3. Bhajana (Nandan Prasad & Mishra Shyam Lal) - 5:57
4. Le Mode Suha Kamode (Svami D.R. Parvatikar) - 12:42
5. Jatisvaram (Bala Sarasvati Orchestra) - 4:01
6. Alapana (P.R. Balasubrahmanyam) - 2:30
7. Alapana (K.S. Pichiappa, K.M. Dakshinamurti, T. Subrahmanya Pillai & Muthu Kumaram) - 3:18
8. Kriti (Kamala Krishnamurti) - 5:00
9. Tirmana (K. Ganeshan) - 0:59
10. Le Mode Varali (D. K. Pattammal, Tiruvallur Subrahmanyam, Palghat Kunjumani & Shiva Pattamal) - 9:48
11. Ganesha Kumara (Budalur Krishnamurti Shastri, Varahur Muthusvami Aiyar & Tinniyam Venkatarama Aiyar) - 4:34

=== Disc 3 ===
1. Pallavi (Mudi Kondan C. Venkatarama, Vellore Gopalachari, M. Chandrasekaran & Karaikudi Mutha) - 6:06
2. Javali (T. Viswanathan & T. Ranganathan) - 4:03
3. Pallavi (Unknown Artist) - 9:02
4. Javali (D. K. Pattammal, Kalyan Krishna Bhagavatar & Karaikudi Muttu Aiyar) - 2:52
5. Sdhincene (Kalyan Krishna Bhagavatar, Devakotai Narayana Iyengar & Karaikudi Mutha) - 4:57
6. Varnam (Radha Shri Ram Orchestra) - 4:00
7. Varnam (S. Vidya) - 3:09
8. Varnam (Bala Saravasti Orchestra) - 7:17
9. Sandehamunu (T. Viswanathan & T. Ranganathan) - 4:49
10. Ninyako (Tiruvallur Subrahmanyam, D. K. Pattammal, Palghat Kunjumani & Shiva Pattamal) - 4:25
11. Solo De Mridangam (Muthu Kumaram) - 3:34
12. Jnana Vinayakané (Radha Shri Ram Orchestra) - 1:42

== Personnel ==
=== Credits ===
- Jacques Brunet - liner notes
- Noriko Aikawa - liner notes
- Serge Moreux - liner notes
- Jacques Cloarec - liner notes, photography
- Raymond Burnier - photography
- S. Bassouls - photography
- Alain Daniélou - recording, photography, illustration (inside drawings), liner notes

== See also ==
- Unesco Collection: A Musical Anthology of the Orient
