= Mabo, Togo =

- Location in Togo
- Coordinates: 9°48′N 0°46′E
- Country: Togo
- Region: Kara Region
- Prefecture: Bassar Prefecture
- Time zone: UTC + 0

Mabo, Togo is a village in the Bassar Prefecture in the Kara Region of north-western Togo.
