= Habib Hassan Touma =

Palestinian-Israeli ethnomusicologist and composer, (1934–1998)

- حبيب حسن توما
- Born: December 12, 1934; Nazareth, Mandatory Palestine
- Died: August 10, 1998 (aged 63)
- Education: Free University of Berlin
- Occupations: Composer, ethnomusicologist
- Years active: 1968-1998
- Notable work: The Music of the Arabs

Habib Hassan Touma (Arabic: حبيب حسن توما) (12 December 1934 – 10 August 1998) was an Israeli-Palestinian composer and ethnomusicologist who lived and worked for many years in Berlin, Germany.

He is mainly known for his book The Music of the Arabs and other ethnomusicological studies. In his compositions he combined Arabic music with classical European music.

== Life and career ==
=== Early life and education ===
Touma was born to an Arab Christian family in Nazareth, Mandatory Palestine, on 12 December 1934. After graduating from Nazareth High School, he worked as a teacher in Arab communities in both Galilee and Nazareth. He then pursued further studies in music at the Rubin Conservatory of Music in Haifa and in pedagogy at the Oranim Academic College. He went on to do graduate studies in musical composition with Alexander Uriah Boskovich at the Israel Conservatory of Music and the Buchmann-Mehta School of Music at the University of Tel Aviv.

After completing his studies in Tel Aviv, Touma returned to teaching; working in the Ramatayim region at the French Mission school and the American Baptist Children's Village. He then left Israel for Berlin to pursue further studies at the Free University of Berlin. In 1968 he received his PhD with a thesis about the maqam bayati in the Arabic taqsim.

=== Professional career ===
Touma authored a number of books, essays and musicological studies on Arabic, Turkish and Iranian music, among them The Music of the Arabs, first published in 1975 in German and translated into several languages. He was also a book review editor for the ethnomusicological journal The World of Music, published by the International Institute for Traditional Music in Berlin. Among other studies based on his field work in Arab countries, he published a description and photographs of the Work Songs of the Gulf Pearl Divers of Bahrain. Another of his studies treated the Arabic musical influence on the Iberian Peninsula during the period of Al-Andalus.

At the end of the 1970s and in 1981, Touma published three articles about Arabic musical culture and education in Arab countries, including teaching music for the Arab citizens of Israel. He advocated that this teaching should not be imposed from the outside but from the Arab communities. In his view, musical education must build on "real Arabic qualities" and "real Arab musical culture."

=== The Music of the Arabs ===
In his book The Music of the Arabs, Touma described his conception of Arabic music in both ethnic and historical, geographical and musicological terms. Further, his book covered the secular and religious, almost two thousand year old, common musical traditions from North Africa to the Middle East, but not Arabic folk music or popular modern music. He described Arabs as citizens of an Arab state, who speak Arabic and have a basic understanding of Arab culture.

The origins of Arabic music date back to the pre-Islamic period in the Arabian Peninsula. It was further developed in the Islamic period in centres such as Mecca, Medina, Baghdad and Córdoba in Al-Andalus. After the 13th century, cities such as Fez, Tétouan, Tlemcen, Algiers, Tunis, Tripoli, Cairo, Beirut, Aleppo, Damascus, Bahrain, Sanaa and Aden contributed to these developments.

Touma defined the determining character of Arabic music by five common features: a tonal system with specific interval structures, rhythmic-time structures that offer a variety of possibilities to accompany the vocal and instrumental genres, characteristic musical instruments played with standardized playing techniques, specific social contexts (music in the cities, in the countryside or in the culture of the Bedouins) and a specific musical mentality for the aesthetic effect of music.

This musical mentality is determined by the Arabic maqam phenomenon and the predominance of vocal music, small ensembles, where improvisation is more feasible than with large orchestras. Further, sequences of small melodic elements and their repetition, combination and change, the absence of polyphony and development of the musical motifs as in Western music, as well as changes between free and fixed modal and temporal structures, such as in longer genres such as the Iraqi maqam, the Andalusi nubah or the waslah in the countries of the Levant.

=== Touma's compositions and death ===
His own compositions of 20th-century music that blend Arabic influences and European classical music, were published by Israel Music Publications in Tel Aviv and in the collection New Israeli Piano Music. – Touma died in Berlin on 10 August 1998.

== Selected bibliography ==
- Touma, Habib Hassan (1971), "The Maqam Phenomenon: An Improvisation Technique in the Music of the Middle East", Ethnomusicology, vol. 15, no. 1, University of Illinois Press, pp. 38–48, doi:10.2307/850386, ISSN 0014-1836, JSTOR 850386
- Touma, Habib Hassan (1977). "The Fidjrí, a Major Vocal Form of the Bahrain Pearl-divers". The World of Music. 19 (3/4): 121–127. ISSN 0043-8774. JSTOR 43560495.Frank Callaway, International Society for Music Education, ed. (1976), "Music Education in Arabian Society: its Implementation, Efficacy, Handicaps and Dangers", Challenges in Music Education, Perth: University of Western Australia, pp. 370–373, ISBN 978-0-9599791-1-4
- The Music of the Arabs, trans. Laurie Schwartz. Portland, Oregon: Amadeus Press. (1996). ISBN 0-931340-88-8
- Die Nūbah Māyah. Zur Phänomenologie des Melos in der arabisch-andalusischen Musik Marokkos: eine Strukturanalyse der Nūbah Māyah. (1998) Hildesheim; Zürich; New York: Olms, ISBN 978-3-487-10741-7 (in German).
- „Andalusian Nūba in Morocco“, The Garland Encyclopedia of World Music.

== Compositions ==
- Maqam Bayati, Israel Music Publications.
- Rhapsodie Orientale, Israel Music Publications.
- Study #1 (For Flute), Israel Music Publications.
- Study #2 Combinations (For Flute), Israel Music Publications.
- Reflexus I, for 12 Solo-Streicher oder Streichorchester, Tel Aviv: Israeli Music Publications
- Taqsim for solo piano, Israel Music Publications
- Suite Arabe for solo piano, Israel Music Publications
