= UNESCO Collection =

World music record label under the aegis of UNESCO

UNESCO Collection is a world music record label, under the aegis of UNESCO. The full title of the series was UNESCO Collection of Traditional Music of the World.

Starting in 1961, the label, created in collaboration with Alain Daniélou, has recorded and issued recordings of traditional world music. Its recording activity was mainly in the 1960s and 1970s. It was composed of a number of subseries of recordings: Musical Sources (Philips 6586 001 — Philips 6586 045), Musical Atlas (EMI/Odeon), A Musical Anthology of the Orient (Bärenreiter/Musicaphon BM 30 2001 — BM 30 2032), An Anthology of African Music (Bärenreiter/Musicaphon BM 30 2301 — BM 30 2314), and An Anthology of North Indian Classical Music (Bärenreiter/Musicaphon BM 30 SL 2051 — BM 30 SL 2054; reissued by Rounder as CD 5101-5104.) It was a pioneer in documenting authentic, traditional world music.

From the 1990s, titles were reissued by Naïve/Auvidis under new subcollections, as well as some new issues and compilations. However, the partnership with Naïve/Auvidis ended in 2005. Recently some titles have been reissued by Rounder Records. From 2014 to 2015, Smithsonian Folkways re-released the portion of the collection formerly released by Naïve/Auvidis, and also released 12 previously unpublished albums.

== See also ==
- UNESCO Collection of Representative Works, the equivalent for books
- World music
- List of record labels
