= An Anthology of African Music =

Compilation album series

An Anthology of African Music is a series of recordings of traditional music that was made for the International Music Council by the International Institute for Comparative Music Studies and Documentation (Berlin/Venice) and released on the Musicaphon label by Bärenreiter (Kassel/Basel/London). The series was directed by Paul Collaer. It was part of the larger and longer enduring UNESCO Collection series.

== Recordings ==
- Music of the Dan — BM 30 L 2301

Reissued as Rounder CD 5105. Review by Adam Greenberg on Allmusic, .

- Music from Rwanda — BM 30 L 2302

Reissued as Rounder CD 5106. Review by Adam Greenberg on Allmusic, .

- Ba-Benzélé Pygmies — BM 30 L 2303

Reissued as Rounder CD 5107. Review by Eugene Chadbourne on Allmusic, .
The three albums above (Dan through Ba-Benzélé Pygmies) were reviewed by David Rycroft in Journal of the International Folk Music Council 19 (1967), pp. 164-166, JSTOR 942265.

- Ethiopia I - Music of the Ethiopian Coptic Church — BM 30 L 2304
- Ethiopia II - Music of the Cushitic Peoples of South-West Ethiopia — BM 30 L 2305

These two albums reviewed by Kurt Suttner in Ethnomusicology 14, #3 (September 1970), pp. 530-532, JSTOR 850628.

- Nigeria-Hausa Music I — BM 30 L 2306
- Nigeria-Hausa Music II — BM 30 L 2307
- Music of the Senufo — BM 30 L 2308
- Chad Kanem — BM 30 L 2309
- Musics of the Central African Republic — BM 30 L 2310

Reviewed by Alan P. Merriam in Ethnomusicology 15, #2 (May 1971), pp. 300-302, JSTOR 850481.

- Nigeria III: Igbo Music — BM 30 L 2311

Reviewed by Darius L. Thieme in Ethnomusicology 36, #1 (Winter 1992), pp. 137-140, JSTOR 852093.

- Sudan I - Music of the Blue Nile Province; The Gumuz Tribe — BM 30 SL 2312 (1986)

Reissued as Auvidis D 8072.

- Sudan II - Music of the Blue Nile Province; The Ingessana and Berta Tribes — BM 30 SL 2313 (1986)

Reissued as Auvidis D 8073.
The two albums above were reviewed by Cynthia Tse Kimberlin in Ethnomusicology 34, #2 (Spring-Summer 1990), pp. 349-352, JSTOR 851708.

- Ethiopia III - Three Chordophone Traditions — BM 30 SL 2314 (c. 1985)

Reissued as Auvidis D 8074. Reviewed by Ashenafi Kebede in Ethnomusicology 34, #1 (Winter 1990), pp. 196-198, JSTOR 852383.

== See also ==
- UNESCO Collection
