= Baka Beyond =

Musical group

- Origin: United Kingdom/Cameroon
- Genres: Celtic, Baka music, world
- Years active: 1992–present
- Members: Su Hart (UK); Martin Cradick (UK); Paddy Le Mercier (France); Ayodele Scott (Sierra Leone); Seckou Keita (Senegal); Kibisingo Douglas (Congo); Denise Rowe (UK); Tim Robinson (UK); Clyde Kramer; Ellie Jamison
- Past members: Eleanor Churchlow; Sam Djengue (Cameroon); Mark Pinto; Nii Tagoe (Ghana); Lakh Niasse (Senegal)
- Website: https://bakabeyond.net/

Baka Beyond is a world music group formed in 1992 with members from a wide variety of backgrounds and cultures, fusing Celtic and other western music styles with traditional Baka music from Cameroon.

== Biography ==
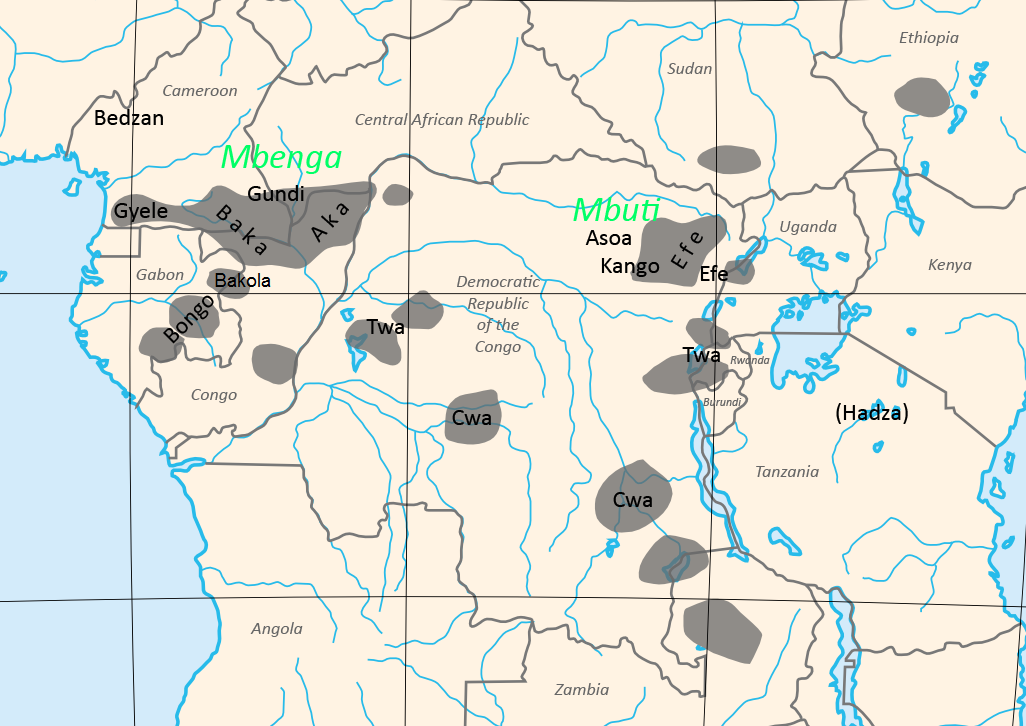
Location of pygmy peoples

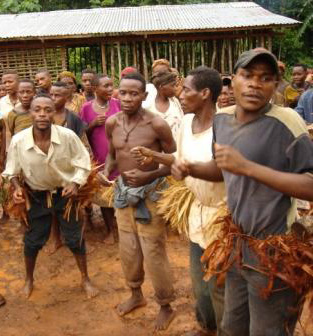
Baka dancers in the East Province of Cameroon

Baka Beyond began in 1992, when vocalist Su Hart and her partner – guitar, mandolin and bouzouki player Martin Cradick (formerly of the group Outback) travelled to south-east Cameroon to live with the Baka tribe in the rainforest and record their music. The band was inspired by the Baka, "one of the oldest and most sensitive musical cultures on earth". Su Hart said "It was the amazing bird-like singing or yelli that first attracted me, ... The women get together before the dawn to sing, enchant the animals of the forest and ensure that the men's hunting will be successful. Song and dance are used by the Baka for healing, for rituals, for keeping the community together and also for pure fun."

In the early days of the band, Baka Beyond was made up of English musicians who aimed to re-create the sound recorded with the Baka people and integrate it into their own music. Joined by Breton fiddler Paddy Le Mercier, Cradick and Hart recorded two albums with musicians from the Baka tribe: Spirit of the Forest, released in 1994; and The Meeting Pool, released in October 1995. The group continued to evolve into a touring ensemble with the addition of Senegalese percussionist Sagar N'Gom, an ex-member of Outback; keyboardist Tom Green, formerly of the Orb; drummer Sam Pope; bassist Marcus Pinto; and vocalist Kate (Budd) Hardy. Baka Beyond's 1998 album, Journey Beyond, was a more heavily produced project featuring guests including percussionists from the Ghanaian band Kakasitsi. The international nature of the band eventually grew to include musicians from Senegal, Brittany, Sierra Leone, Congo and Ghana as well as Cameroon and Britain.

The relationship with the Baka themselves has grown with regular return visits keeping the band's inspiration strong. Over twenty years Martin Cradick and other members of the band travelled back to the rainforest to record music with the Baka people. They have recorded many albums containing a mix of music and sounds directly recorded from the rainforest, and music recorded by the band, which always shows a strong influence from Baka music. The band touring all the world (the Czech Republic, Spain, France, Portugal, Greece and Britain), Baka Beyond have played at WOMAD and Glastonbury, as well as headlining the Vancouver Folk-Roots Festival. Their tracks are often heard on TV soundtracks, particularly in nature programmes, and have been nominated for the BBC Radio 3 World Music listeners' awards.

Baka Beyond often perform with Rinky Dink, a mobile musical sound system that operates on power provided by two bicycles and solar panels.

== Activism ==
Much of the profit from Baka Beyond's albums has been spent improving things in the rainforest, and a new music house – a large 'music house' with recording equipment – was built at the request of the tribe. The title of the group's album, The Rhythm Tree, refers to this project. "It was all out of this one tree," Cradick told BBC World Service's Outlook programme. "They all use these trees – they beat on the buttress roots as the bass drum. So we called the album the Rhythm Tree." Through the charity Global Music Exchange Baka Beyond continue to work with the Baka with healthcare, education and in obtaining national ID cards that give the Baka basic rights as citizens, normally denied them due to their extreme poverty and "unconventional" lifestyle. The Music House has now become a centre for the Baka pygmies – and for people wishing to meet with them, this ongoing relationship with the Baka community has helped the tribe win land rights and recognition as Cameroonian citizens.

== Artistry and sound ==
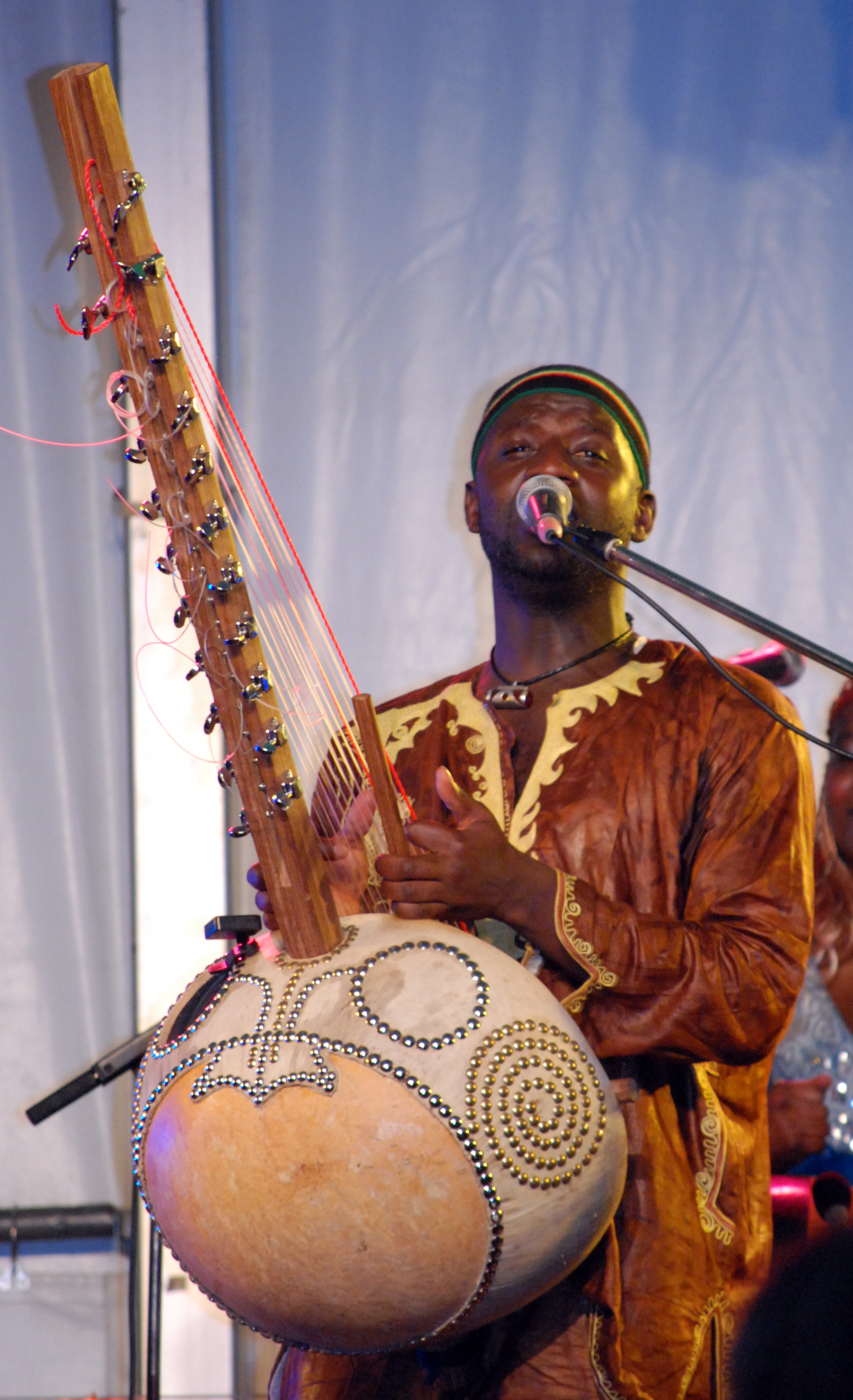
Band member Seckou Keita playing in Albany, Western Australia.

"If there has to be a definition of world music, this is it" said BBC's Andy Kershaw.

Baka Beyond's sound is a fusion of music influenced by the Baka people, African rhythms and traditional Celtic tunes. A combination of soul-stirring West African traditional rhythms, singing and dance of the Baka, with Celtic folk harmonies and singing, "with powerful percussion section, rhythmic guitar and fiery fiddle…" Each musician has contributed their own style to the band. Baka Beyond is a collaborative music process, learned from the Baka people – 'everyone to be listened to'. Generally, their songs contain strong rhythms, traditional Baka singing style and exotic instruments including marimba, djembe, ning nong, soga, kongoma, kpanlogo, tama, kalabash and kora (African Harp). According to the Guardian "They are an infuriatingly jovial multi-racial band" ..."and would be utterly intolerable if it weren't for the fact that they are remarkably good musicians and impressively idealistic." Other reviewers have found "It was impossible to resist the relentlessly upbeat nature of the music" "The party atmosphere is irrepressible," says the Evening Standard. "If you are not dancing, maybe you should have someone check your pulse."

== Other projects ==
- Seckou Keita, Martin Cradick and Nii Tagoe recorded a CD in 2001 called Éte.
- One Heart Global Music Exchange is a charity supporting many tribes in Africa through music and musical projects, run by the band and its supporters.
- In 2006, the album Gati Bongo was released. Martin Cradick recorded the Baka musicians live in the rainforest with a mobile and a solar-powered multi-track recorder and the band became known as Orchestre Baka Gbiné. In February 2012, a new recording, Kopolo was made to be released later in 2012.
- In April 2006, Baka Beyond began a UK tour. For this tour, they invited seven Baka musicians, Orchestre Baka Gbine, who had never before left the rainforest, to tour with them. This event was covered by many national newspapers and TV stations.
- Folk Music and Dance Festival Ethiopia is a music festival held in Arba Minch, Ethiopia, run by Su Hart and Martin Cradick.
- In January 2010, Martin Cradick and Su Hart of Baka Beyond, together with Andi Main of Global Music Exchange organised a festival of traditional music and dance in Cameroon, the Under the Volcano Festival.
- In February and March 2014, Martin and Clyde Kramer (Baka Beyond's drummer) with Andi Main and Jonny organised The Forest Voices Tour. Fifteen Baka musicians toured other Baka communities and encouraged discussions about problems that all the Baka face.

== Discography ==
- Spirit of the Forest (1993)
- Heart of the Forest (1993)
- The Meeting Pool (1995)
- Outback (1996)
- Journey Between (1998)
- Sogo (2000)
- East to West (2002)
- Rhythm Tree (2005)
- Baka Live (2007)
- Beyond the Forest (2009)
- After the Tempest (2014)

== See also ==
- Baka (tribe)
