= Traditions of Music and Dance =

- Discipline: Music and dance research
- Language: English
- Edited by: Lonán Ó Briain

Publication details
- Former names: Journal of the International Folk Music Council; Yearbook of the International Folk Music Council; Yearbook for Traditional Music
- History: 1949–present
- Publisher: International Council for Traditions of Music and Dance
- Frequency: Biannual

Standard abbreviations
- ISO 4: Tradit. Music Dance

Indexing
- ISSN: 0740-1558 (print); 2304-3857 (web)
- LCCN: 82647116
- JSTOR: 07401558
- OCLC no.: 960771625

Links
- Journal homepage

Traditions of Music and Dance is a peer-reviewed academic journal covering research on folk music and dance.

It is published by the International Council for Traditions of Music and Dance, twice a year. One of editor-in-chief was Lonán Ó Briain.

The journal was originally established in 1949 as the Journal of the International Folk Music Council, renaming itself Yearbook of the International Folk Music Council in 1969, and Yearbook for Traditional Music in 1981, obtaining its current title in 2025.

The journal is abstracted and indexed in the Arts & Humanities Citation Index and Current Contents/Arts & Humanities.
