= Su Hart =

British musician (born 1959)

- Born: 3 September 1959 (age 67); Gateshead, England
- Genres: English folk, worldbeat
- Occupations: Singer, musician, songwriter, teacher, painter
- Instruments: Voice, guitar,
- Years active: 1980–present

Su Hart (born 3 September 1959) is a British choir leader, singer-songwriter and composer, as of 2006 based in Bath, UK, and vocalist of the band Baka Beyond. Baka Beyond was formed in 1992, when she and her partner, Martin Cradick, travelled to south-east Cameroon to live with the Baka tribe in the rainforest and record their music. Hart founded the Walcot State Choir in Bath, and helped run the Shakti Sings Choir at the Glastonbury Festival in 2013.

== The Baka ==
Hart is originally from Gateshead, and is a musician, choir leader, singer-songwriter and composer. In 1992, Hart and her partner Martin Cradick (formerly of the group Outback) travelled to south-east Cameroon to live with the Baka tribe (hunter-gatherer Pygmies) in the rainforest and record their music. The band was inspired by the Baka, "one of the oldest and most sensitive musical cultures on earth". The encounter with the Baka was to set their lives in a new direction. "It was the amazing bird-like singing or 'yelli' that first attracted me, ... The women get together before the dawn to sing, enchant the animals of the forest and ensure that the men's hunting will be successful. Song and dance are used by the Baka for healing, for rituals, for keeping the community together and also for pure fun" In 2006 Hart helped to bring the Cameroonian band Orchestre Baka Gbine to Gateshead.

Hart founded the Walcot State Choir in Bath in 2000 and has directed it since. The choir has collaborated in cultural exchanges with the Ensemble Vocal Maitres Et Maitresses of Auch, France, and choirs in Kaposvar, which is twinned with Bath.

In 2013, Hart helped to run the Shakti Sings Choir at the Glastonbury Festival, writing songs to raise ecological awareness.
