= Alain Daniélou =

French historian, Indologist and musicologist (1907–1994)

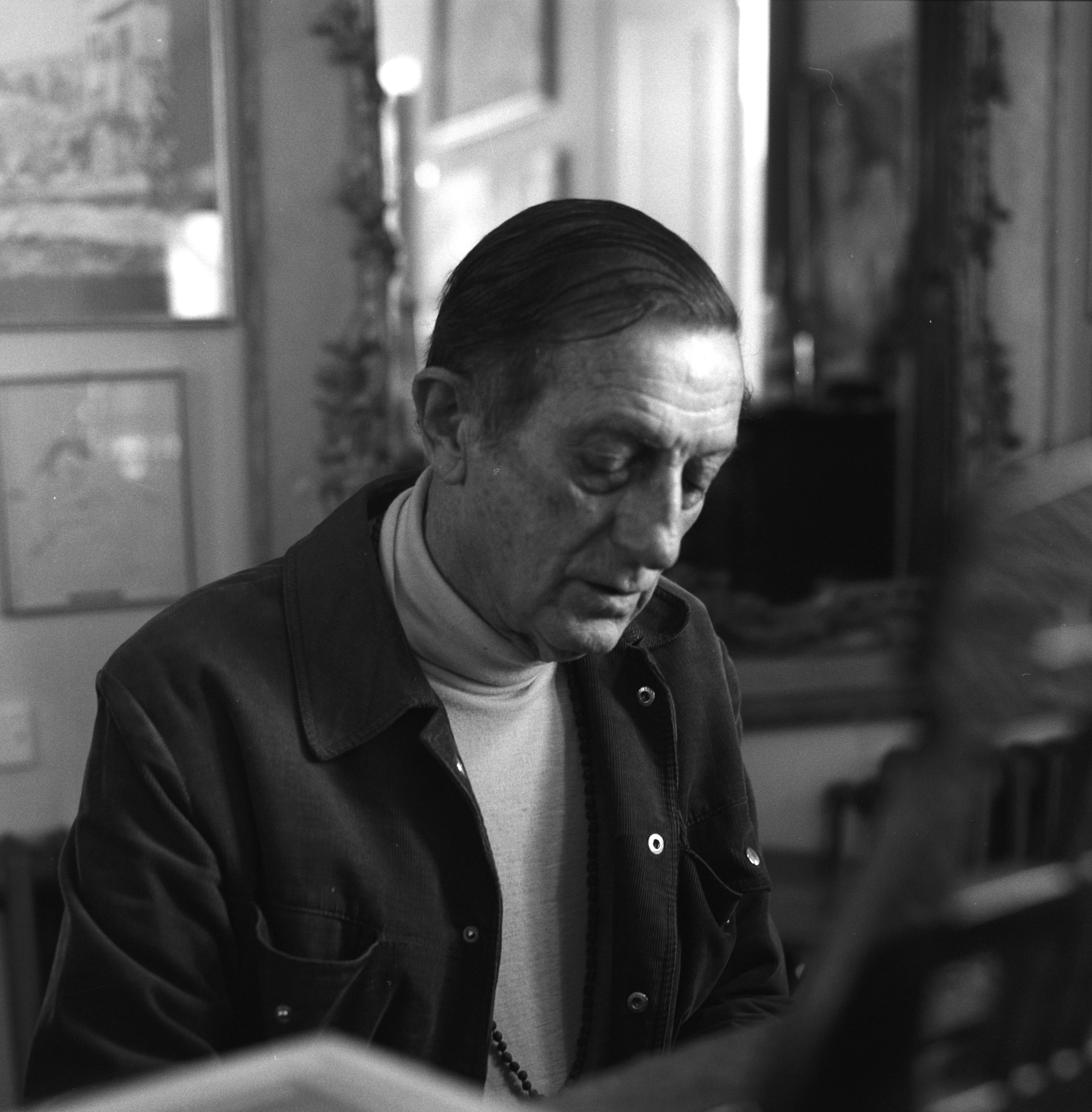
- Alain Daniélou playing the piano
- Born: 4 October 1907; Neuilly-sur-Seine, France
- Died: 27 January 1994 (aged 86); Lonay, Switzerland
- Occupations: Historian, Indologist, musicologist, translator, writer
- Partner: Raymond Burnier
- Relatives: Jean Daniélou
- Writing career
- Subjects: Culture of India, Hindu studies, Indian classical music, Indian philosophy, Shaivite Hinduism
- Notable works: Introduction to the Study of Musical Scales (1943); The Myths and Gods of India: The Classic Work on Hindu Polytheism (1964); Gods of Love and Ecstasy: The Traditions of Shiva and Dionysus (1979)
- Website: www.alaindanielou.org

Alain Daniélou (French: [danielu]; 4 October 1907 – 27 January 1994) was a French historian, Indologist, intellectual, musicologist, translator, writer and convert to and scholar of the Shaivite branch of Hinduism.

In 1991, he was awarded the Sangeet Natak Akademi Fellowship, the highest honour conferred by Sangeet Natak Akademi, India's National Academy for Music, Dance, and Drama.

== Early life and education ==
His mother, Madeleine Clamorgan, was from an old family of the Norman nobility; a devout Roman Catholic, she founded schools and a religious order, the Order of Sainte-Marie, for women teachers in civilian costume under the patronage of St. François-Xavier. His father, Charles Daniélou, was an anti-clerical Breton politician who held numerous national ministerial posts in the Third Republic. One of his brothers was the Roman Catholic prelate and Académie Française member, Jean Daniélou.

He received his education at the Institution Notre-Dame de Sainte-Croix, Neuilly-sur-Seine, and at St. John's College, Annapolis. The young Daniélou studied singing under Charles Panzéra, as well as classical dancing with Nicholas Legat (teacher of Vaslav Nijinsky), and composition with Max d'Ollone. Subsequently, he performed professionally on stage with dancers such as Floria Capsali and Marjorie Daw. Growing up, he rebelled against his mother's strong religious devotion, but his father remained a positive influence, which helped in developing his musical talent and in coping with his homosexuality. He studied piano and singing, learning the songs of Duparc and Chausson and the liederkreis of Schumann and Schubert. He started writing poems, and acquired proficiency in English and other European languages.

== Career ==
=== India: 1932–1960 ===
He and his partner, the Swiss photographer Raymond Burnier, first went to India as part of an adventure trip, and they were fascinated with the art and culture of the nation. Daniélou and Burnier were among the first Westerners to visit India's erotic Hindu temples in the village of Khajuraho and Burnier's photographs of the ancient temple complex launched the site internationally. The photographs were featured in an exhibition at the New York's Metropolitan Museum.

In 1932, during his first trip to India, he met poet Rabindranath Tagore. His close association with Tagore led him to become the director of Tagore's school of music at Shantiniketan (Visva-Bharati University). Subsequently, in 1935, he joined the Banaras Hindu University, where he studied Hindustani music, Sanskrit language and literature, Hindu philosophy, and Hindu religion for the next 15 years of his life. In 1949, he was appointed a research professor at the University, a post he held until 1953; he also remained the director of the College of Indian Music. In Bénarès (now Varanasi), he lived in a mansion on the banks of the Ganges, named Rewa Kothi. During these years, he studied Indian classical music in Bénarès with Shivendranath Basu and played the veena, a classical Indian instrument which he started playing professionally. He also studied Hindi and Sanskrit languages, as well as Indian philosophy.

His interest in the symbolism of Hindu architecture and sculpture lead him to long trips with Burnier to Khajuraho, Bhubaneswar, and Konarak, sites located in central India and Rajasthan. He also translated some works of Swami Karpatri, the samnyasin by whom he was initiated into Shaivism under the Hindu name Shiva Sharan ("Protected by Shiva"). In 1942, he published his translation of the Tirukkural, a Tamil moral literature.

In 1953, he joined the Adyar Library and Research Centre at the Theosophical Society Adyar near Madras (now Chennai), where he was the director of a centre of research into Sanskrit literature until 1956. In 1959, he became a member of French Institute of Pondicherry, which works in the field of Indology.

=== Europe: 1960 onwards ===
Upon his return to Europe in 1960, he was appointed an advisor to the UNESCO's International Music Council, which led to a number of recordings of traditional music such as Unesco Collection: A Musical Anthology of the Orient, Musical Atlas, Musical Sources, and Anthology of Indian Classical Music - A Tribute to Alain Daniélou. In 1963, he became the founder and director of the International Institute for Comparative Music Studies and Documentation (IICMSD) in West Berlin, where he remained till 1977; he was also the director of the Istituto Internazionale di Musica Comparata (IISMC) in Venice from 1969 to 1979.

He worked on Indian classical music. But his more important contribution to Indology is his writings on the ancient wisdom of the Vedas, Hindu philosophy, and Shaivism.

He is the author of over thirty books on Indian music and culture. He received several awards for his work on music. He was also a photographer and artist.

== Awards and recognition ==
Daniélou was an Officer of the Légion d'Honneur, an Officer of the Ordre National du Mérite, and Commander of Arts and Letters. He was the director of the UNESCO Collection series, a series of recordings of traditional world music. In 1981, Daniélou received the UNESCO/CIM prize for music, and, in 1987 the Kathmandu Medal from UNESCO.

== Legacy ==
In 2004, to mark his tenth death anniversary a photo exhibition, "India through the eyes of Alain Danielou (1935-1955)" was hosted at the Alliance Française, Hyderabad.

== Works ==
- While the Gods play, Shaiva Oracles and Predictions on the Cycles of History and Destiny of Mankind (French: La Fantaisie des Dieux et L'Aventure Humaine, 1985)
- Gods of Love and Ecstasy, The Tradition of Shiva & Dionysus, Omnipresent Gods of Transcendence
- The Hindu Temple; Deification of Eroticism
- Music and the Power of Sound
- A Brief History of Indiapublished by Inner Traditions
- The complete Kâma Sûtra The first unabridged translation.
- Virtue, success, pleasure & liberation: the four aims of life in the tradition of ancient India
- Ragas of North Indian Classical Music
- The Way to the Labyrinth: An Autobiography published by New Directions.
- The Myths and Gods of India, Hindu Polytheism
- Yoga: the Method of Reintegration
- Yoga, Mastering the Secrets of Matter and the Universe
- Fools of God
- Song-poems - Rabindranath Tagore, Texts in English, French and Bengali & Melodies
- The Congress of the World With miniatures of tantric cosmology
- Sacred Music, its Origins, Powers and Future, Traditional Music in Today's World
- The Situation Of Music And Musicians In The Countries Of The Orient
- Introduction to The Study of Musical Scales
- Northern Indian Music: Vol. One, Theory, History and Technique
- Northern Indian Music: Vol. Two, The Main Ragas
- The Phallus, Sacred Symbol of Male Creative Power
- India, a civilization of differences: the ancient tradition of universal tolerance
- Shiva And The Primordial Tradition: From the Tantras to the Science of Dreams
- Manimekhalaï, The Dancer With The Magic Bowl Translation by Alain Daniélou
- Shilappadikâram, The Ankle Bracelet
- Sacred Music, Its Origins, Powers And Future
- A Descriptive Catalogue Of Sanskrit Manuscripts in Alain Daniélou's Collection at the Giorgio Cini Foundation

== Discography ==
- Unesco Collection: A Musical Anthology of the Orient
- Anthology of Indian Classical Music - A Tribute to Alain Daniélou
- Musiciens et Danseurs de la caste des Ahirs (1951)
- Religious Music of India (1952)
- Musical Atlas
- Musical Sources (Philips, Holland)
- Anthology of North Indian Classical Music - (Bärenreiter-Musicaphon, Kassel)

== Filmography ==
- 2023: Alain Daniélou, l'esprit libre, a documentary by fr:Joël Farges, Kolam, 77', ISAN 0000-0006-EA8A-0000-F-0000-0000-T.
- 2017: Alain Daniélou - The Way to the Labyrinth, a documentary by Riccardo Biadene, KAMA Productions.

== See also ==
- Michel Danino
- Jean Filliozat
- Francois Gautier
- Louis Renou
- Tirukkural translations into French
