= Hugo Zemp =

Swiss-French ethnomusicologist (1937–2026)

Hugo Zemp (14 May 1937 – 3 January 2026) was a Swiss-French ethnomusicologist. A prolific recorder of ethnic music and a writer on the subject, he has also shot a number of films about music of various regions, including 1988 film Voix de tête, voix de poitrine and 2002 film An African Brass Band filmed by him in Ivory Coast in 2002. His wide musical expertise includes music notably in Africa, Oceania and Switzerland. He also had particular interest in yodeling and lullabies.

His recordings of lullabies from Solomon Islands were later released by UNESCO as part of their Musical Sources collection. One lullaby he recorded in 1970, a traditional Baegu lullaby from the Solomon Islands called "Rorogwela" was sung by Afunakwa, an elderly woman from northern Malaita. The recording was later used in Deep Forest's song "Sweet Lullaby".

Zemp studied musicology and anthropology at the University of Basel graduating in 1961. He also finished a diploma in percussion at the City of Basel Music Academy in 1960. He attended École pratique des hautes études for his doctorate.

He joined French National Centre for Scientific Research (CNRS) becoming a director of research. He taught ethnomusicology at the Paris Nanterre University In 1982, he became editor the recording series (Collection du Centre National de la Recherche Scientifique et du Musée de l'Homme on the Le Chant du Monde record label. In tens of productions by Zemp, it included music from Azerbaijan, Bangladesh, Bolivia, Burkina Faso, Chad, Ivory Coast, Romania, Solomon Islands and various countries in Central Africa. There were also a number of recordings of yodeling from Switzerland.

Zemp died on 3 January 2026, at the age of 88.

== Select bibliography ==
- Musique dan. La musique dans la pensée et la vie sociale d'une société africaine (1971)
- Aré'Aré: un peuple mélanésien et sa musique (1978, with Daniel de Coppet). Paris: Editions du Seuil

== Select filmography ==
- Musique 'Aré'aré (1979) - filmed in Malaita, the Solomon Islands
- Tailler le bambou (1979) - filmed in Malaita, the Solomon Islands
- Les noces de Susanna et Josef (1987)
- Yootzing and Yodeling (1987) - focuses on the juuz (pronounced "yootz"), the raw, traditional natural yodel of the Muotathal valley in the Swiss Pre-Alps. It explores the style as it exists in everyday peasant life, contrasting it against formal, conductor-led concert choirs.
- Voix de tête, voix de poitrine (1988)
- Le Chant des harmoniques (The Song of Harmonics), with Trân Quang Hai (1989)
- The Feast day of Tamar and Lashari (1998)
- Funeral Festivities (2001) - part of Zemp's broader ethnomusicological deep dives into the ritualistic, social, and spiritual roles that musical performance plays during community grieving ceremonies among the Senufo people of northern Côte d'Ivoire, the balafon is an emblematic musical instrument. This film shows balafon orchestras playing in five villages during the two principal days of funeral festivities.
- Une fanfare africaine (2002)
- An African Brass Band (2004–2006) - explores African polyphony and the adoption of Western brass instruments into local celebratory and ceremonial structures
- Chants funéraires du Caucase géorgien (2008)
- Musique Aré 'aré : un inventaire explicatif des vingt types de musique traditionnelle du peuple Aré'aré de Malaita (2008)
- Les maîtres du balafon (2011)
- Siaka, musicien africain (2011)
- Swiss Yodeling – 30 Years Later (2015) - a follow-up film where Zemp returns to the Muotathal valley of Switzerland. He tracks down the individuals he filmed three decades prior—including a boy who grew from age 7 to 37—to see how modern society, globalization, and the Swiss Yodeling Association have affected authentic regional styles.

== Films about Hugo Zemp ==
- Searching for Afunakwa: The Story Behind Deep Forest's "Sweet Lullaby" (dir. Matt Singmin, 2026)

== Select discography ==
- Musique de Guadalcanal: Solomon Islands (1970) – recording
- Musique Polynésienne Traditionnelle d'Ontong Java (Iles Salomon) (1971) – recording
- Flutes de pan mélanésiennes 'Are'Are 1 (1971) – recording
- Flutes de pan mélanésiennes 'Are'Are 2 (1972) – recording
- Fataleka And Baegu Music - Malaita, Solomon Islands (1973) – recording
