= Garland Encyclopedia of World Music =

Academic music reference work

- Author: Various
- Country: American
- Language: English
- Genre: History of music
- Publisher: Garland Publishing
- Published: 1996 - 2001
- No. of books: 10

The Garland Encyclopedia of World Music is an academic reference work. It was initiated by editors at Garland Publishing in 1988 as a 10-volume series of encyclopedias of world music. The final volumes appeared in 2001, but editions have since been updated. It is widely regarded as an authoritative academic source for ethnomusicology. It is published by Routledge, which, like Garland Science, is now part of Taylor & Francis Group.

- Volume 1: Africa - ed. Ruth M. Stone (Professor of Folklore and Ethnomusicology, Indiana), 1997
- Volume 2: South America, Mexico, Central America, and the Caribbean - ed. Daniel E. Sheehy and Dale A. Olsen, 1998
- Volume 3: The United States and Canada - ed. Ellen Koskoff (Professor of Ethnomusicology. Eastman School of Music), 2000
- Volume 4: Southeast Asia - ed. Terry E. Miller (Professor Emeritus of Ethnomusicology, Kent State University) and Sean Williams (Evergreen State College), 1998
- Volume 5: South Asia: The Indian Subcontinent - ed. Alison Arnold (North Carolina State University), 1999
- Volume 6: The Middle East - ed. Virginia Danielson (Loeb Music Library, Harvard) and Dwight Reynolds, 2001
- Volume 7: East Asia: China, Japan, and Korea - ed. Robert C. Provine (Professor of Ethnomusicology, University of Maryland) and J. Lawrence Witzleben, 2001
- Volume 8: Europe - ed. Timothy Rice (Professor of Ethnomusicology, UCLA Herb Alpert School of Music) and James Porter, 2000
- Volume 9: Australia and the Pacific Islands - ed. Adrienne L. Kaeppler (curator of Oceanic Ethnology at the Smithsonian) and J. W. Love, 1998
- Volume 10: The World's Music: General Perspectives and Reference Tools - ed. Ruth M. Stone

Since 2010, all ten volumes of the encyclopedia have been available on Alexander Street via individual or institutional subscription.
