= Deep Forest (disambiguation) =

Deep Forest is a musical group comprising French musicians Eric Mouquet and Michel Sanchez.

Deep Forest may also refer to:

- Deep Forest (Deep Forest album), 1992, and the title song
- Deep Forest (Do As Infinity album), 2001
- "Deep Forest", a song by Nash the Slash on his album Children of the Night
- Deep Forest Raceway, a track in the Gran Turismo series of video games
