= World Mix =

Studio album by Deep Forest
- Released: 13 April 1994
- Genre: World music
- Length: 1:16:33
- Label: Columbia Records COL 476589-2
- Producer: Dan Lacksman

Deep Forest chronology
Deep Forest (1992)	World Mix (1994)	Boheme (1995)

Professional ratings
Review scores
Source	Rating
AllMusic	2/5 stars
Gavin Report	(favorable)
Knoxville News Sentinel	4/5 stars

World Mix is a re-release of the 1992 Deep Forest debut, self-titled studio album. It was published by Columbia Records on 13 April 1994.

== Track listing ==
1. "Deep Forest" – 5:34
2. "Sweet Lullaby" – 3:54
3. "Hunting" – 3:27
4. "Night Bird" – 4:18
5. "The First Twilight" – 3:18
6. "Savana Dance" – 4:26
7. "Desert Walk" – 5:14
8. "White Whisper" – 5:46
9. "The Second Twilight" – 3:02 (Original 1992 release length is 1:24)
10. "Sweet Lullaby (Ambient Mix)" – 3:44
11. "Sweet Lullaby (Round the World Mix)" – 6:48
12. "Sweet Lullaby (Apollo Mix)" – 7:20
13. "Deep Forest (Sunrise at Alcatraz)" – 7:07
14. "Forest Hymn (Apollo Mix)" – 6:46
15. "Forest Hymn" – 5:49 (Originally issued as a bonus track on the 1992 Japanese release)

== Credits ==
- Eric Mouquet – arrangement, keyboards, programming
- Michel Sanchez – arrangement, keyboards, programming
- Michel Villain – vocals
- Cooky Cue – keyboards and programming on "Savana Dance", engineer
- Dan Lacksman – Producer, engineer, mixing
- Guilain Joncheray – executive producer
- Pete Arden – remixing on "Sweet Lullaby (Round the World Mix)"
- Jose Reynoso – engineer on "Sweet Lullaby (Round the World Mix)"
- Apollo 440 – remix, additional production on "Sweet Lullaby (Apollo Mix)" and "Forest Hymn (Apollo Mix)"
- Mark Spoon – remix, additional production on "Deep Forest (Sunrise at Alcatraz)"
- Daniel Iriibaren – remix, additional production on "Deep Forest (Sunrise at Alcatraz)"

== Charts ==
Chart (1994)	Peak position
Australian Albums (ARIA Charts)	14

== Certifications ==
Region	Certification	Certified units/sales
New Zealand (RMNZ)	Platinum	15,000^{^}
Norway (IFPI Norway)	Gold	25,000^{*}
^{*} Sales figures based on certification alone.^{^} Shipments figures based on certification alone.
