= Strange Days (film) =

1995 film by Kathryn Bigelow

- Theatrical release poster
- Directed by: Kathryn Bigelow
- Screenplay by: James Cameron; Jay Cocks
- Story by: James Cameron
- Produced by: James Cameron; Steven-Charles Jaffe
- Starring: Ralph Fiennes; Angela Bassett; Juliette Lewis; Tom Sizemore; Vincent D'Onofrio; Michael Wincott
- Cinematography: Matthew F. Leonetti
- Edited by: Howard Smith (Note: James Cameron had performed extensive editing, but wasn't eligible for a credit as he wasn't yet a part of the Motion Picture Editors Guild.)
- Music by: Graeme Revell
- Production company: Lightstorm Entertainment
- Distributed by: 20th Century Fox (United States, Canada, France and Italy); Universal Pictures (through United International Pictures, international)
- Release dates: October 7, 1995 (New York Film Festival); October 13, 1995 (United States)
- Running time: 145 minutes
- Country: United States
- Language: English
- Budget: $42 million
- Box office: $17 million

Strange Days is a 1995 American science fiction thriller film directed by Kathryn Bigelow, from a screenplay by James Cameron and Jay Cocks based on a story by Cameron. The film stars Ralph Fiennes, Angela Bassett, Juliette Lewis, Tom Sizemore, Michael Wincott, Brigitte Bako, and Vincent D'Onofrio. Set in a dystopian version of Los Angeles on the last two days of 1999, the film follows Lenny Nero (Fiennes), a black marketeer of an electronic device that allows a user to experience the recorded memories and physical sensations of other people, and Lornette "Mace" Mason (Bassett), a bodyguard and limousine driver, as they are drawn into a criminal conspiracy involving Nero's ex-girlfriend Faith Justin (Lewis) and friend Iris (Bako).

Blending science fiction with film noir conventions, Strange Days explores themes such as racism, abuse of power, rape and voyeurism. Although Cameron began work on the story around 1986, the film incorporates high-profile incidents from the early 1990s, such as the police violence against Rodney King and the 1992 Los Angeles riots. Principal photography began in Los Angeles on June 6, 1994, and concluded on October 14. Several of the film's scenes, which offer a point-of-view shot, required multi-faceted cameras and considerable technical preparation.

A major commercial failure, Strange Days nearly derailed Bigelow's career, grossing only $17 million against its $42 million budget. The film polarized critics upon release; while some praised the cinematography, visual style, and performances of the cast, others criticized its portrayal of rape and violence. Its critical standing has improved over the years, gaining a cult following. At the 22nd Saturn Awards, where the film received five nominations, Bassett won Best Actress and Bigelow became the first woman to win Best Director.

== Plot ==
As 1999 nears its end, Los Angeles has become a dangerous war zone. A Chinese restaurant is robbed by a group of criminals, with one recording the event with a SQUID (Superconducting QUantum Interference Device), an illegal electronic device that records memories and physical sensations directly from the wearer's cerebral cortex onto a MiniDisc-like storage device.

Lenny Nero, a former LAPD officer turned black marketeer of SQUID recordings, buys the robbery clip from his main supplier Tick. Elsewhere, Iris, a prostitute and former friend of Faith Justin (Lenny's ex-girlfriend), is chased by LAPD officers Burton Steckler and Dwayne Engelman. Iris escapes on a subway car, but Engelman pulls off her wig, revealing a SQUID recorder headset.

Lenny pines for Faith and relies on emotional support from his two best friends—Max Peltier, a private investigator, and Lornette "Mace" Mason, a bodyguard and limousine driver. Mace has unrequited feelings for Lenny from when he was still a cop and acted as a father figure for her son after her boyfriend was arrested on drug charges, but disapproves of his SQUID-dealing business. While Lenny and Max are drinking at a bar, Iris drops a SQUID disc through the sunroof of Lenny's car before it is towed away. Mace picks Lenny up and takes him to a nightclub where Faith is going to sing. There, Lenny receives a SQUID disc from an anonymous contact and unsuccessfully tries to get Faith away from her new boyfriend, Philo Gant. Philo is a music industry mogul who managed the recently murdered rapper Jeriko One.

While in the car with Mace, Lenny plays the disc the contact gave him and watches as Iris is brutally raped and murdered by an attacker at the Sunset Regent hotel. As they approach the hotel, Iris's body is taken out on a stretcher. The next day, they take the disc to Tick, who cannot identify the source of the recording, but recalls that Iris was looking for Lenny. Deducing Iris may have left something in Lenny's car, Mace and Lenny go to the impound and find Iris's disc. Steckler and Engelman appear and demand the disc at gunpoint, but Lenny and Mace escape in her bullet-resistant car before being forced to stop at a dock. Steckler pours gasoline on the car and sets it on fire, but Mace drives it into the harbor, extinguishing the flames. When they reach the surface, the cops have left.

Mace takes Lenny to her brother's house, and they watch Iris's disc, showing Iris was with Jeriko One when Steckler and Engelman pulled him over and murdered him, because his anti-police lyrics and activism incited protests against the LAPD. The two return to Tick, who Max explains has been rendered brain-dead from forced exposure to amplified SQUID signals. Lenny fears Iris's attacker covered his tracks by "killing" Tick and will come after Faith. Back at the nightclub, Lenny and Mace confront Faith, who reveals that Philo is afraid Iris's disc would reveal that he kept his artists under surveillance. Lenny and Mace disagree over whether to trade the disc to Philo for Faith's freedom or release it publicly, which could incite a citywide riot. As midnight approaches, Lenny and Mace sneak into a private party that Philo is hosting at the Westin Bonaventure Hotel for the city's wealthy elite. Lenny has a change of heart and tells Mace to give the disc to deputy police commissioner Palmer Strickland.

In Philo's penthouse suite, Lenny finds Philo brain-dead on the floor and another disc, revealing Faith's affair with Max, who "fried" Philo's brain with an amplified recording of them feigning rape. Pointing a gun at Lenny, Max explains that Philo hired him to kill Iris, but when Philo wanted Faith dead as part of the coverup, he decided to frame Lenny for the murders. Lenny and Max struggle in a fight. Faith intervenes and pulls off Max's wig with a SQUID inside - assuring a confession - and Max stabs Lenny in the back. The fight culminates with Lenny on the balcony with Max hanging over; Lenny pulls the knife from his back to cut his necktie and drop Max to his death. Lenny goes downstairs to find Mace, leaving Faith standing alone on the balcony.

Meanwhile, on the crowded streets, Mace subdues Steckler and Engelman with a baton and taser, but other officers take down Mace. The crowd moves in, in support of Mace, and a major riot seems inevitable. Strickland, who has viewed Iris's disc, arrives and orders Mace's release and the arrest of Steckler and Engelman for murder. Engelman commits suicide; Steckler threatens Mace, but the officers gun him down. Lenny finds Mace, and the two share a hug before she gets in Strickland's car. Then Lenny drags her out, and they share a kiss as the crowd celebrates the turn of the new millennium.

== Cast ==
- Ralph Fiennes as Lenny Nero
- Angela Bassett as Lornette "Mace" Mason
- Juliette Lewis as Faith Justin
- Tom Sizemore as Max Peltier
- Michael Wincott as Philo Gant
- Vincent D'Onofrio as Burton Steckler
- Glenn Plummer as Jeriko One
- Brigitte Bako as Iris
- Richard Edson as Tick
- William Fichtner as Dwayne Engelman
- Josef Sommer as Palmer Strickland

== Production ==
=== Development ===
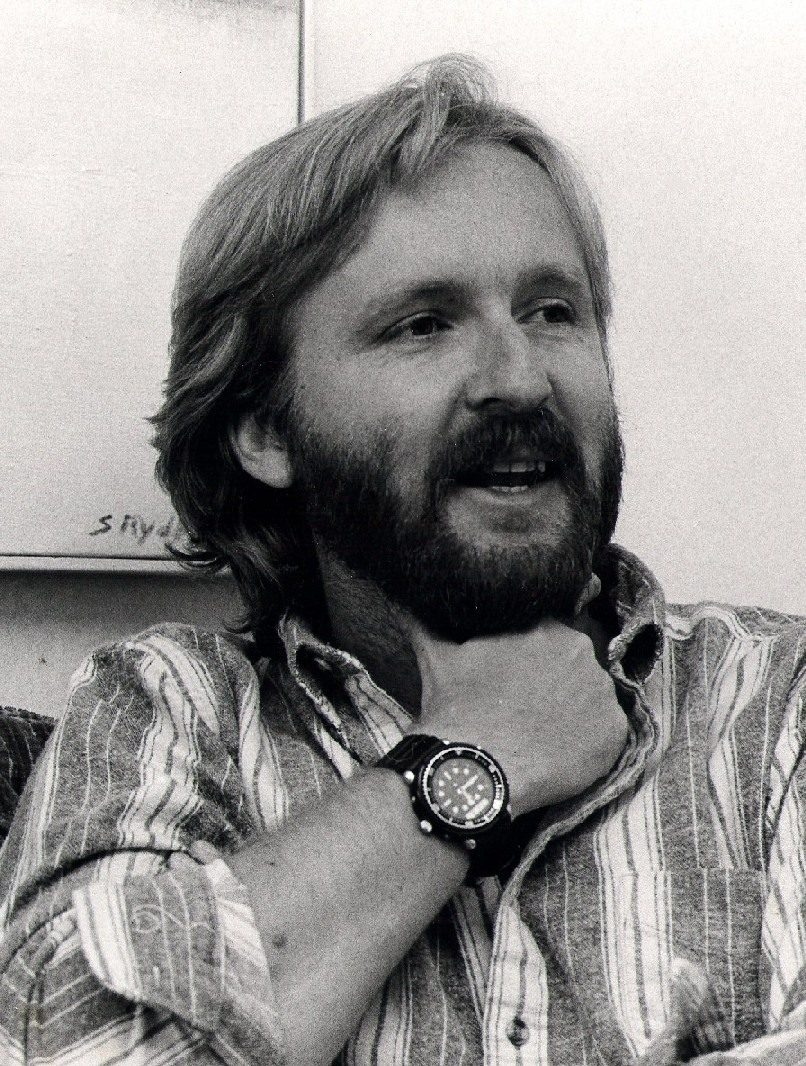
Producer James Cameron began work on the story of Strange Days around 1985.

Producer James Cameron began work on the story of Strange Days around 1985. He wrote with Kathryn Bigelow in mind to direct the film, and when he presented it to her she "thought it was tremendous". According to her, "These two characters on the eve of the millennium, with one character trying to get the woman who loves him to help him save the woman he loves. It's this great emotional matrix." After a series of dialogues, Cameron and Bigelow developed the film's political elements. Cameron focused more on the romantic side, while Bigelow centered more on "the edginess, the grit" part of the film. Cameron later wrote a 90-page treatment based on these dialogues, stating that it was "practically a novel, but it was unwieldy; it needed structure". The treatment was then presented to screenwriter Jay Cocks, who turned it into a script. Cameron felt that the resulting script was very well structured and only did a dialogue polish on top of it. The script was completed in 1992.

Bigelow's work on Strange Days was influenced by the 1992 Los Angeles riots that followed the Rodney King verdict. She noted, "I was involved in the downtown cleanup, and I was very moved by that experience. You got a palpable sense of the anger and frustration and economic disparity in which we live." She worked with Jay Cocks, co-writer of the script with James Cameron, in particular on the development of the character of Mace and on the "complexity of the rape sequences". Both Strange Days and Cameron's 1994 action film True Lies were part of a multimillion-dollar production deal between Lightstorm Entertainment and 20th Century Fox. However, the financing was unevenly divided between the two films, with Strange Days being initially budgeted at $30 million and True Lies at $70 million.

=== Casting ===
Angela Bassett was attached to the film from its early stages, after Bigelow sent her the treatment document and Bassett accepted the role. In January 1994, it was reported that Andy Garcia was close to being cast as Lenny. However, on February 3, 1994, The Hollywood Reporter revealed that Ralph Fiennes had been cast instead and that he was wrapping up negotiations to play the role. Fiennes' breakthrough role in Schindler's List, for which he was nominated for the Academy Award for Best Supporting Actor just days later, impressed Bigelow enough to cast him as Lenny. She stated that the role "required somebody who had a tremendous amount of intelligence, complexity, depth, a series of qualities that I really felt only Ralph could supply". Cameron, however, initially felt that a "glibber and slicker" actor would be better for the role, but admitted that Fiennes made Lenny "a sexier character — a guy you can care about very much".

The Hollywood Reporter also announced that Bono was expected to join Fiennes and Bassett in the role of Faith's love interest and manager Philo Gant. In March 1994, columnist Army Archerd reported in Variety that Bono was still being sought for the role, which would eventually be played by Michael Wincott. In May 1994, Juliette Lewis, was cast alongside Fiennes and Bassett. The fact that Lewis was able to sing was important because the producers wanted to avoid lip-synching.

=== Filming ===
Filming of Strange Days was originally slated to begin on May 12, 1994, but that date was delayed to June 6, as the cast needed to be finalized. Bigelow said that the O. J. Simpson murder trial "[echoed] the film events", adding that Strange Days was filmed during the summer and fall of that year. The film was entirely shot in Los Angeles over a period of 77 nights. Producer Steven-Charles Jaffe said that the city was generally very cooperative, except for the subway scene, as the team only had four hours a night to film it. Jaffe, however, remarked that Bigelow "was so well prepared that what would have taken another director several weeks to do, she did in a matter of days". The production team also received permission from the West Hollywood film commission to film on Sunset Boulevard for a two-day period, which required the shutdown of several lanes of traffic.

The scene where the crowd celebrates the turn of the new millennium at the end of the film was shot at the corner of the 5th and Flower streets, between the Westin Bonaventure Hotel and the Los Angeles Public Library. Over 50 off-duty police officers were hired to control an assembled crowd of 10,000 people, who had to pay $10 in advance to attend the event. The filmmakers also hired rave promoters Moss Jacobs and Philip Blaine to produce performances featuring Aphex Twin, Deee-Lite, as well as "all the cyber-techno bands they could garner". It was reported that a total of $750,000 was spent on the event, which included the rental of half of the 1,300 rooms in the Bonaventure. The event started at 9 p.m. on Saturday, September 17, 1994, and ended shortly before its scheduled end at 4 a.m. the next morning, as five people were hospitalized for suffering overdoses of ecstasy.

The film's SQUID scenes, which offer a point-of-view shot, required multi-faceted cameras and considerable technical preparation. A full year was spent building a specialized camera that could reproduce the effect of looking through someone else's eyes. Bigelow described it as "a stripped-down Arri that weighed much less than the smallest EYMO and yet it would take all the prime lenses". Cinematographer Matthew F. Leonetti was also hired to help Bigelow film the scenes, which were choreographed weeks in advance. The opening sequence, which features a 16-foot jump between two buildings by a stunt performer without a safety harness, took two years to coordinate and has hidden cuts. For example, the jump was filmed with a helmet camera, while the run up a staircase required a Steadicam. According to Cameron, "We designed transitions that would work seamlessly. It was a very technical scene that doesn't look technical." The sequence where Iris runs in front of a speeding freight train was shot backwards, with the train backing up. The footage was then reversed during editing.

=== Music ===
World music was chosen as the primary music style of Strange Days, due to its variety of sounds and instruments. According to music supervisor Randy Gerston, who had previously worked on True Lies, this type of music helped the filmmakers create a futuristic atmosphere, noting that "the world is shrinking and people are getting acclimated to strange languages being part of the pop vernacular". Michael Kamen was the first composer hired to create a score for the film. Michel Sanchez and Éric Mouquet, the French duo known as Deep Forest, were then hired to replace Kamen's work. In addition to their score, Deep Forest teamed up with Peter Gabriel to write an original song for the film's end credits, titled "While the Earth Sleeps". New Zealand composer Graeme Revell, fresh off writing the score for The Crow, was then hired to replace most of Deep Forest's work. Revell also worked with singer-songwriter Lori Carson on an original song that appears over the film's final scene, titled "Fall in the Light".

Bigelow was a fan of English musician PJ Harvey and chose two of her songs, "Rid of Me" and "Hardly Wait", to be performed onscreen by Lewis. British alternative rock band Skunk Anansie appeared in the film, performing at the New Year's Eve party, and they were encouraged to jam between takes so Bigelow could record them live and give the rave a greater sense of authenticity. Although the band would have a live sound on the film, they ultimately had to lip sync. The American industrial punk band Season to Risk performed the song "Undone" live in the nightclub scene, selected for their sound and stage presence. Other musicians featured on the soundtrack included British trip hop artist Tricky, Belgian electronic group Lords of Acid, and the American heavy metal band Prong. A soundtrack album was released on October 3, 1995. In addition, 60,000 promotional CD-ROMs, which contained production material from the film and music clips from the soundtrack, were made available only through the "College Special" issue of Rolling Stone magazine that was sold at record stores.

Strange Days (Music from the Motion Picture) track listing
No.	Title	Writer(s)	Performer(s)	Length
1.	"Selling Jesus"	Skin, Len Arran	Skunk Anansie	3:43
2.	"The Real Thing"	Praga Khan, Jade 4 U, Oliver Adams	Lords of Acid	3:33
3.	"Overcome"	Tricky, Skip Fahey, Marcella Detroit	Tricky	4:31
4.	"Coral Lounge"	Eric Mouquet, Michel Sanchez	Deep Forest	3:28
5.	"No White Clouds"	Morrylien Jenkins, Ngozi L. Inyama, Tara Thierry	Strange Fruit	6:02
6.	"Hardly Wait"	PJ Harvey	Juliette Lewis	3:13
7.	"HereWEcome"	Chris Cuben-Tatum, ME PHI ME	ME PHI ME/Jeriko One	4:56
8.	"Feed"	Skin, Richard "Cass" Lewis, Martin "Ace" Kent	Skunk Anansie	2:43
9.	"Strange Days"	The Doors	Prong feat. Ray Manzarek	4:22
10.	"Walk in Freedom"	The Satchel Partnership	Satchel	3:32
11.	"Dance Me to the End of Love"	Leonard Cohen	Kate Gibson	4:27
12.	"Fall in the Light"	Graeme Revell, Lori Carson	Lori Carson & Graeme Revell	4:22
13.	"While the Earth Sleeps"	Mouquet, Sanchez, Peter Gabriel	Peter Gabriel and Deep Forest	3:52
Total length:				52:50

== Themes ==
Although Strange Days is generally classified as a science fiction thriller, the film uses multiple narrative elements such as film noir conventions like the femme fatale. The terms "techno-thriller", "tech-noir", and "futuristic erotic thriller" have also been used. In 2001, cultural critic Steven Shaviro compared Strange Days to Cameron's earlier films, stating that the film "has characters that the viewer is supposed to identify with, and a plot full of thrills, exciting action sequences and unexpected twists. But at the same time, Strange Days is very much an experimental film, one that questions and inverts the traditional and Hollywood structures of identification and involvement, in ways that are consonant with the ideas that have been put forward by feminist film criticism over the last thirty years." The film's dystopian society and use of SQUID technology, which has been compared to the "simstim" technology in William Gibson's 1984 novel Neuromancer, were also considered cyberpunk concepts.

The film explores controversial themes such as abuse of power, racism, and rape. Voyeurism is also a major element due to the protagonist's extensive use of SQUID technology. The fact that the film was directed by a woman was even more controversial, with film critic Michael Mirasol noting that had Strange Days been directed by a man, these scenes would likely have been criticized as sexist and misogynistic. Nevertheless, Bigelow insisted that the film does not glorify violence and that it has a positive purpose. According to her, "I wanted to treat 'the system' fairly, because if it's the enemy, then we're the enemy, since by not changing it we're reproducing it... The film ends in a strong insistence on hope. Ultimately it's humanity - not technology - that takes us into the next century and the next millennium." In 2015, The Washington Post editor Sonny Bunch felt that Strange Days was still relevant, comparing the imagery captured by the SQUID units to that of first-person shooters or cellphone videos on YouTube. He added that events such as Jeriko One's murder and the subsequent coverup of the crime by the two police officers contribute to activist movements like Black Lives Matter, and that their media documentation amplifies their reception and consequences.

Mace was seen as a strong yet very feminine character, as she often rescues Lenny in dire situations and shows maternal concern for him. Both characters represent a significant contrast: Mace is the film's hero and moral center, whereas Lenny is the antihero; Mace is black and Lenny is white; and finally, Mace represents the "hard-edged, reality-based" component, while Lenny is dominated by fantasies. This is especially notable when Mace yells to Lenny, "This is your life! Right here! Right now! It's real time, you hear me? Real time, time to get real, not playback!" The film's white characters also tend to be nihilistically concerned with the present, while the black characters are generally future revolutionaries. Bigelow considered Strange Days her most personal film, claiming that "It's a synthesis of all the different tracks I've been exploring, either deliberately or unconsciously, ever since I started making art."

== Release ==
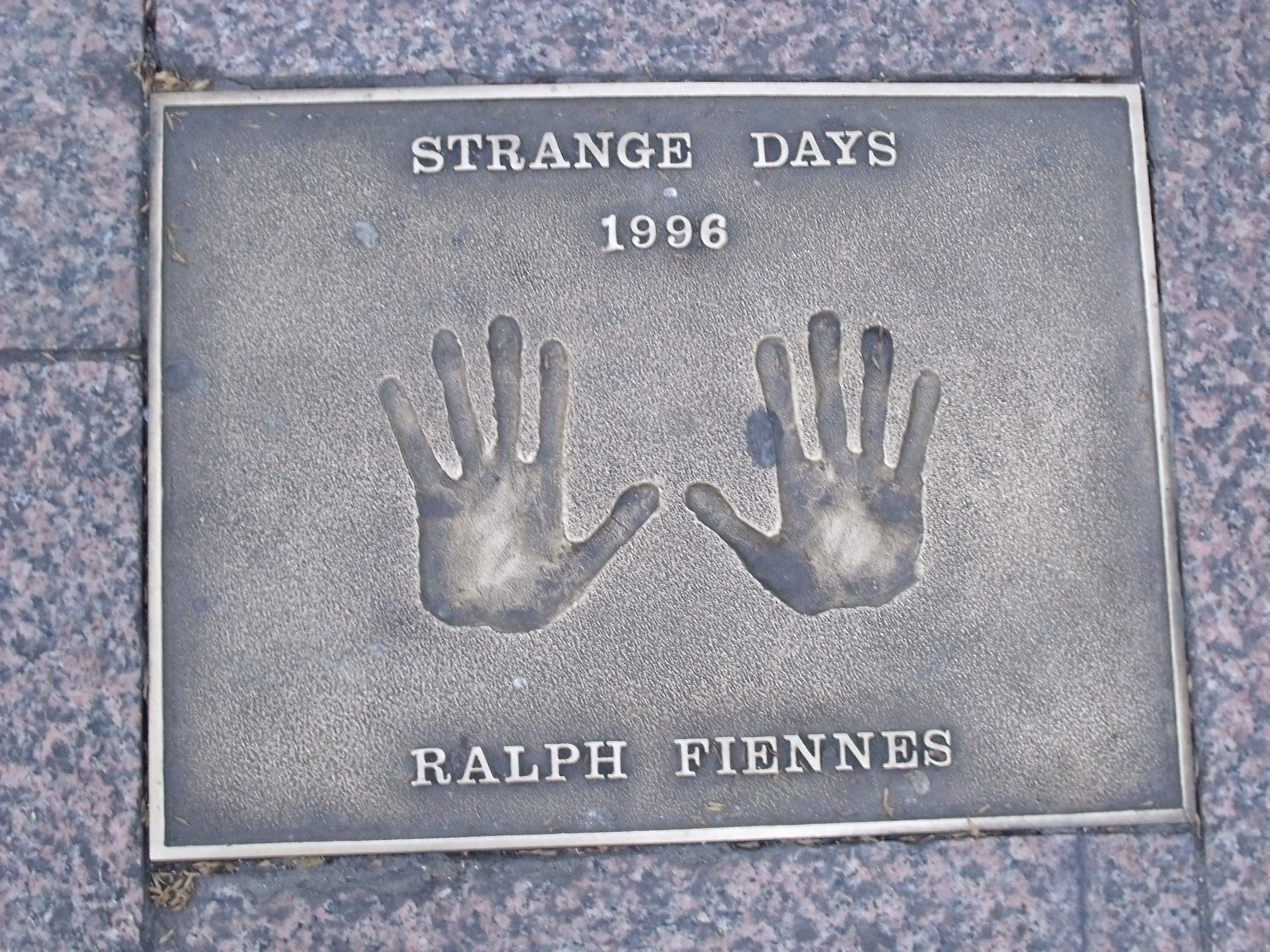
Ralph Fiennes' handprints in Leicester Square from the film's London premiere

=== Box office ===
Strange Days premiered at the New York Film Festival on October 7, 1995, the same day it opened in limited release at the Ziegfeld Theatre in Manhattan, where it grossed $31,062 in its first weekend. One week later, on October 13, it entered wide release, opening in 1,691 theaters and grossing $3.7 million that weekend. The film's poor performance at the box office was compared to Jade and The Scarlet Letter, which opened at the same time and had a similar budget. Overall, the film went on to make $8 million in the United States and Canada, little more than a sixth of its $42 million production cost. As a result, Strange Days was considered a commercial failure, due in part to the poor marketing strategy and lack of audience understanding. The film almost derailed Bigelow's career, as five years would pass before she directed her next film, The Weight of Water. Internationally, Strange Days was distributed by United International Pictures where it grossed $9 million for a worldwide total of $17 million.

=== Critical reception ===
Upon release, Strange Days polarized film critics. Roger Ebert, who gave the film four out of four stars, described it as "a technical tour de force" and highlighted the film's astute use of SQUID technology, stating that "Bigelow is able to exploit the idea of what is happening; she forces her audience to deal with the screen reality, instead of allowing us to process it as routine 'action.'" The film's technical aspects were also praised by Variety editor Todd McCarthy, who remarked that no other film since Lady in the Lake in 1947 had "experimented so extensively with the subjective camera". In a mixed review, Owen Gleiberman of Entertainment Weekly gave the film a "B−" rating, concluding that Strange Days "has a dazzling atmosphere of grunge futurism, but beneath its dark satire of audiovisual decadence lurks a naggingly conventional underworld thriller." Edward Guthmann of the San Francisco Chronicle criticized the film for failing to commentate its violence, saying that "Bigelow's style is so visceral [...] that her movie reminds us of a snuff film, rather than a well-reasoned cautionary tale about our animal instincts." New York magazine writer David Denby called the rape scene "the sickest sequence in modern movies".

The performances of the lead characters were highlighted very positively. Writing for Chicago Tribune, film critic Michael Wilmington praised Fiennes' performance because it captures "the weaselly, pleading side of Lenny", while noting "the slight formality of his diction", which he felt gives the character depth. Similarly, in her review for The New York Times, Janet Maslin said that Fiennes "gleefully captures Lenny's sleaziness while also showing there is something about this schlockmeister that is worth saving, despite much evidence to the contrary." As for Bassett, she felt that the character "looks great and radiates inner strength even without the bone-crunching physical feats to which she is often assigned." Peter Travers of Rolling Stone called Strange Days Bigelow's "magnum opus" and credited Bassett's "standout" performance, describing her as "fierce, funny and heart rending". In contrast, Sizemore and Lewis were considered miscast in their roles. At the 22nd Saturn Awards, Bassett won Best Actress and Bigelow became the first woman to win the Best Director award.

Retrospectively, the film's critical standing has improved. Roger Ebert's correspondent Michael Mirasol felt that Strange Days had some obvious weaknesses, including a dialogue that is too polished for its setting, but nevertheless judged its "devotion to its characters, its remarkable use of POVs to create its consistent atmosphere of apprehension and excitement, and most of all, its fearlessness." In 2009, Drew Morton of the Pajiba website considered Strange Days an "extremely underappreciated film" and "the best piece of cyberpunk to grace celluloid since Ridley Scott's Blade Runner." Strange Days also garnered a small cult following, who felt that the film has been overlooked by a casual mass audience and misguided critics.

On Rotten Tomatoes, the film has an approval rating of 71% with an average rating of 7/10, based on reviews from 58 critics. The website's consensus states: "Strange Days struggles to make the most of its futuristic premise, but what's left remains a well-directed, reasonably enjoyable sci-fi fantasy." On Metacritic, it holds a weighted average score of 66 of out 100, based on 30 reviews, indicating "generally favorable reviews". Audiences surveyed by CinemaScore gave the film a grade "B" on a scale of A+ to F.

=== Home media ===
Strange Days was released on VHS in the United States by 20th Century Fox Home Entertainment on April 2, 1996. A special widescreen THX certified LaserDisc was released in the United States on May 22, 1996. The LaserDisc's special features included a one-hour lecture about how the opening scene was filmed, two deleted scenes, a music video for "Selling Jesus" directed by Kathryn Bigelow, the original teaser and theatrical trailers, and photo galleries of storyboards and production stills. On September 28, 1999, the film was released on DVD in the United States, containing all the features from the LaserDisc version except for the music video and photo galleries. The film was released on Blu-ray in Germany on April 23, 2015, by Koch Media, containing all the features from the LaserDisc version except the photo galleries. The Blu-ray was released in the United Kingdom on September 25, 2017, by Mediumrare Entertainment.

== In popular culture ==
- A line from this film, "Right here! Right now!" was sampled by Fatboy Slim for his single "Right Here, Right Now".
