= 1994 MTV Video Music Awards =

Award ceremony

- Date: Thursday, September 8, 1994
- Location: Radio City Music Hall, New York, New York
- Country: United States
- Hosted by: Roseanne Barr
- Most awards: R.E.M (4)
- Most nominations: Aerosmith (9)

Television/radio coverage
- Network: MTV
- Produced by: Doug Herzog; Joel Stillerman
- Directed by: Bruce Gowers

The 1994 MTV Video Music Awards aired live on September 8, 1994, honoring the best music videos from June 16, 1993, to June 15, 1994. The show was hosted by Roseanne Barr at Radio City Music Hall in New York City, and this would be the last time there was a female host for the VMAs until Chelsea Handler hosted in 2010. Kurt Cobain, frontman of rock band Nirvana, was honored this night after his death on April 5.

Michael Jackson and Lisa Marie Presley opened the show by Michael giving a speech. They ended it by taking a long kiss in front of everyone. In another notable moment, David Letterman escorted Madonna onto the stage and told the singer to watch her language, poking fun at Madonna's controversial appearance on the Late Show with David Letterman five months earlier.

R.E.M. was, for the second time in their careers, the biggest winner of the night, taking home four technical awards for their video "Everybody Hurts." Closely following were hip-hop group Salt-n-Pepa and rock band Aerosmith, both of which earned three moonmen that night. Aerosmith's video for "Cryin'", in fact, won the two main awards of the night, Video of the Year and Viewer's Choice, making it the second video in VMA history to achieve this feat. This would also be the last time that the nominees for Viewer's Choice were the same as those for Video of the Year, as MTV discontinued this rule the next year.

In terms of nominations, meanwhile, Aerosmith was the night's biggest nominee, earning a total of nine nominations for two of their videos: "Cryin'" received four general nominations, while "Amazing" earned five professional ones. Right behind them were R.E.M., whose video for "Everybody Hurts" was the night's most nominated video with seven nominations, and newcomer Björk, who received six nominations for "Human Behaviour."

== Background ==
MTV announced in late June that the 1994 Video Music Awards would be held on September 8 at Radio City Music Hall, marking the ceremony's return to New York City for the first time since 1986 and to Radio City for the first time since 1985. Nominees were announced at a press conference held at New York City Hall on July 13. For the first time since the ceremony's inception, MTV chose not to syndicate the ceremony to broadcast television. The ceremony broadcast was preceded by the 1994 MTV Video Music Awards Opening Act. Hosted by Kurt Loder and Tabitha Soren with reports from Cindy Crawford, Juliette Hohnen, and Alison Stewart, the broadcast featured red carpet interviews, pre-taped features on Roseanne's VMA preparations and New York City's music landmarks, a pre-taped interview with Courtney Love, and a remix of New York City hip-hop music produced by Grandmaster Flash.

== Performances ==
List of musical performances in order of appearance
| Artist(s) | Song(s) | Ref. |
|---|---|---|
| Aerosmith | "Walk This Way" | |
| Boyz II Men | "I'll Make Love to You" | |
| The Smashing Pumpkins | "Disarm" | |
| The Rolling Stones | "Love Is Strong" "Start Me Up" | |
| Green Day | "Armatage Shanks" | |
| Beastie Boys | "Sabotage" | |
| Leningrad Cowboys; Alexandrov Red Army Ensemble | "Sweet Home Alabama" | |
| Salt-n-Pepa | "Push It" "None of Your Business" "Whatta Man" "Shoop" | |
| Tom Petty and the Heartbreakers | "Mary Jane's Last Dance" | |
| Snoop Doggy Dogg | "Murder Was the Case (DeathAfterVisualizingEternity)" | |
| Stone Temple Pilots | "Pretty Penny" | |
| Bruce Springsteen | "Streets of Philadelphia" | |

== Presenters ==
- Michael Jackson and Lisa Marie Presley – opened the show and welcomed the audience
- Tom Jones – presented Best Female Video
- Coolio and Björk – presented Best Dance Video
- Bill Bellamy, Kennedy and Rudy Giuliani – appeared in a vignette about Viewer's Choice voting procedures
- Adam Sandler and Sandra Bullock – presented Best Video from a Film
- Beavis and Butt-Head – appeared in some pre-commercial break vignettes
- Natalie Merchant and Soundgarden (Chris Cornell and Kim Thayil) – presented Breakthrough Video
- Jann Wenner – presented the Lifetime Achievement Award
- Ed Lover and Doctor Dré – appeared in a vignette about Viewer's Choice voting procedures
- Melissa Etheridge and Brendan Fraser – presented Best New Artist in a Video
- Mark Messier and Daisy Fuentes – presented Best Direction in a Video
- Roseanne (host) – introduced the winners of the professional categories
- Naomi Campbell and Denis Leary – presented Best Metal/Hard Rock Video
- Billy Corgan – presented the Video Vanguard Award
- Public Enemy (Chuck D and Flavor Flav) – presented Best Rap Video
- Fab 5 Freddy and Daisy Fuentes – appeared in a vignette about Viewer's Choice voting procedures
- Ben Stiller and Lisa Loeb – presented Best Group Video
- Sheryl Crow and Stephen Dorff – introduced the International Viewer's Choice Award winners
- VJs Gastão Moreira (Brasil), Kristiane Backer (Europe), Hannah (Japan) and Ruth Infarinato (Latin America) – announced their respective region's Viewer's Choice winner
- Toni Braxton and Tony Bennett – presented Best Alternative Video
- Bill Bellamy and Kennedy – presented the Viewer's Choice Award
- Cindy Crawford and Jon Stewart – presented Best R&B Video
- Queen Latifah – presented Best Male Video
- Krist Novoselic – paid a special tribute to Kurt Cobain
- David Letterman – accompanied Madonna on stage (and also appeared in a pre-commercial vignette with Beavis and Butthead)
- Madonna – presented Video of the Year
- John Goodman, Laurie Metcalf, Michael Fishman, Sara Gilbert, Sarah Chalke, Glenn Quinn, and Johnny Galecki – appeared in a post-credits scene on the Roseanne set commenting on the ceremony and its host

== Winners and nominations ==
Nominees were selected by members of the music industry. Winners in general categories were selected by 500 members of the music industry and, for the first time, 500 MTV viewers. Winners in professional categories were selected by members of the music industry. Winners in the Viewer's Choice categories were selected by viewers, with the U.S. winner chosen via a phone poll conducted in the days prior to and during the ceremony.

Winners are in bold text.

| Video of the Year | Best Male Video |
|---|---|
| **Aerosmith – "Cryin'"**; Beastie Boys – "Sabotage"; Nirvana – "Heart-Shaped Box"; R.E.M. – "Everybody Hurts" | **Tom Petty and the Heartbreakers – "Mary Jane's Last Dance"**; Beck – "Loser"; Tony Bennett – "Steppin' Out with My Baby"; Bruce Springsteen – "Streets of Philadelphia" |
| Best Female Video | Best Group Video |
| **Janet Jackson – "If"**; Björk – "Human Behaviour"; Sheryl Crow – "Leaving Las Vegas"; Me'Shell NdegéOcello – "If That's Your Boyfriend (He Wasn't Last Night)" | **Aerosmith – "Cryin'"**; Beastie Boys – "Sabotage"; Green Day – "Longview"; R.E.M. – "Everybody Hurts" |
| Best New Artist in a Video | Best Metal/Hard Rock Video |
| **Counting Crows – "Mr. Jones"**; Beck – "Loser"; Björk – "Human Behaviour"; Green Day – "Longview"; Lisa Loeb and Nine Stories – "Stay (I Missed You)"; Me'Shell NdegéOcello – "If That's Your Boyfriend (He Wasn't Last Night)" | **Soundgarden – "Black Hole Sun"**; Aerosmith – "Cryin'"; Anthrax – "Black Lodge"; Rollins Band – "Liar" |
| Best R&B Video | Best Rap Video |
| **Salt-n-Pepa with En Vogue – "Whatta Man"**; Brand New Heavies – "Dream on Dreamer"; Toni Braxton – "Breathe Again"; R. Kelly – "Bump n' Grind" | **Snoop Doggy Dogg – "Doggy Dogg World"**; Coolio – "Fantastic Voyage"; Cypress Hill – "Insane in the Brain"; Dr. Dre – "Let Me Ride" |
| Best Dance Video | Best Alternative Video |
| **Salt-n-Pepa with En Vogue – "Whatta Man"**; En Vogue – "Runaway Love"; Janet Jackson – "If"; Us3 – "Cantaloop (Flip Fantasia)"; Crystal Waters – "100% Pure Love" | **Nirvana – "Heart-Shaped Box"**; Beck – "Loser"; Green Day – "Longview"; The Smashing Pumpkins – "Disarm" |
| Best Video from a Film | Breakthrough Video |
| **Bruce Springsteen – "Streets of Philadelphia" (from Philadelphia)**; Backbeat Band – "Money" (from Backbeat); Madonna – "I'll Remember" (from With Honors); Sinéad O'Connor – "You Made Me the Thief of Your Heart" (from In The Name of the Father) | **R.E.M. – "Everybody Hurts"**; Beastie Boys – "Sabotage"; Björk – "Human Behaviour"; Deep Forest – "Sweet Lullaby"; Nine Inch Nails – "Closer" |
| Best Direction in a Video | Best Choreography in a Video |
| **R.E.M. – "Everybody Hurts" (Director: Jake Scott)**; Aerosmith – "Amazing" (Director: Marty Callner); Beastie Boys – "Sabotage" (Director: Spike Jonze); Deep Forest – "Sweet Lullaby" (Director: Tarsem) | **Salt-n-Pepa with En Vogue – "Whatta Man" (Choreographers: Frank Gatson and Randy Connor)**; Hammer – "Pumps and a Bump" (Choreographers: Hammer and Randi G.); Janet Jackson – "If" (Choreographer: Tina Landon); Us3 – "Cantaloop (Flip Fantasia)" (Choreographer: Toledo) |
| Best Special Effects in a Video | Best Art Direction in a Video |
| **Peter Gabriel – "Kiss That Frog" (Special Effects: Brett Leonard and Angel Studios)**; Aerosmith – "Amazing" (Special Effects: Cream Cheese Films and Video Image); Björk – "Human Behaviour" (Special Effects: Michel Gondry); Tool – "Prison Sex" (Special Effects: Adam Jones) | **Nirvana – "Heart-Shaped Box" (Art Director: Bernadette Disanto)**; Aerosmith – "Amazing" (Art Director: Ted Baffalucus); Björk – "Human Behaviour" (Art Director: Michel Gondry); Nine Inch Nails – "Closer" (Art Director: Tom Foden) |
| Best Editing in a Video | Best Cinematography in a Video |
| **R.E.M. – "Everybody Hurts" (Editor: Pat Sheffield)**; Aerosmith – "Amazing" (Editors: Troy Okoniewski and Jay Torres); Björk – "Human Behaviour" (Editor: Michel Gondry); Deep Forest – "Sweet Lullaby" (Editor: Robert Duffy); Peter Gabriel – "Kiss That Frog" (Editor: Craig Wood); Meat Puppets – "Backwater" (Editor: Katz); The Smashing Pumpkins – "Disarm" (Editor: Pat Sheffield); Stone Temple Pilots – "Vasoline" (Editor: Kevin Kerslake) | **R.E.M. – "Everybody Hurts" (Director of Photography: Harris Savides)**; Aerosmith – "Amazing" (Director of Photography: Gabriel Beristain); Deep Forest – "Sweet Lullaby" (Directors of Photography: Tarsem and Denise Milford); Nirvana – "Heart-Shaped Box" (Director of Photography: John Mathieson) |
| Viewer's Choice | International Viewer's Choice: MTV Brasil |
| **Aerosmith – "Cryin'"**; Beastie Boys – "Sabotage"; Nirvana – "Heart-Shaped Box"; R.E.M. – "Everybody Hurts" | **Sepultura – "Territory"**; Chico Science – "A Cidade"; Legião Urbana – "Perfeição"; Raimundos – "Nêga Jurema"; Caetano Veloso and Gilberto Gil – "Haiti" |
| International Viewer's Choice: MTV Europe | International Viewer's Choice: MTV Japan |
| **Take That – "Babe"**; The Cranberries – "Linger"; D:Ream – "Things Can Only Get Better"; Enigma – "Return to Innocence"; U2 – "Stay (Faraway, So Close!)"; Whale – "Hobo Humpin' Slobo Babe" | **Hide – "Eyes Love You"**; Chara – "Tsumibukako Aishiteyo"; Original Love – "The Rover"; Seikima-II – "Tatakau Nihonjin"; Izumi Tachibana – "Vanilla" |
| International Viewer's Choice: MTV Latin America | |
**Los Fabulosos Cadillacs – "Matador"**; Caifanes – "Afuera"; La Ley – "Tejedores de Ilusión"; Mano Negra – "El Señor Matanza"
Michael Jackson Video Vanguard Award
**Tom Petty**
Lifetime Achievement Award
**The Rolling Stones**

== Artists with multiple wins and nominations ==
Artists who received multiple awards
| Wins | Artist |
|---|---|
| 4 | R.E.M. |
| 3 | Aerosmith |
| 3 | En Vogue |
| 3 | Salt-n-Pepa |
| 2 | Nirvana |
| 2 | Tom Petty |

Artists who received multiple nominations
| Nominations | Artist |
|---|---|
| 9 | Aerosmith |
| 7 | R.E.M. |
| 6 | Björk |
| 5 | Beastie Boys |
| 5 | Nirvana |
| 4 | Deep Forest |
| 4 | En Vogue |
| 3 | Beck |
| 3 | Green Day |
| 3 | Janet Jackson |
| 3 | Salt-n-Pepa |
| 2 | Bruce Springsteen |
| 2 | Me'Shell NdegéOcello |
| 2 | Nine Inch Nails |
| 2 | Peter Gabriel |
| 2 | The Smashing Pumpkins |
| 2 | Us3 |

== Music Videos with multiple wins and nominations ==
Music Videos that received multiple awards
| Wins | Artist | Music Video |
|---|---|---|
| 4 | R.E.M. | "Everybody Hurts" |
| 3 | Aerosmith | "Cryin'" |
| 3 | Salt-n-Pepa & En Vogue | "Whatta Man" |
| 2 | Nirvana | "Heart-Shaped Box" |

Music Videos that received multiple nominations
| Nominations | Artist | Music Video |
|---|---|---|
| 7 | R.E.M. | "Everybody Hurts" |
| 6 | Björk | "Human Behaviour" |
| 5 | Beastie Boys | "Sabotage" |
| 5 | Nirvana | "Heart-Shaped Box" |
| 5 | Aerosmith | "Amazing" |
| 4 | Aerosmith | "Cryin'" |
| 4 | Deep Forest | "Sweet Lullaby" |
| 3 | Beck | "Loser" |
| 3 | Green Day | "Longview" |
| 3 | Janet Jackson | "If" |
| 3 | Salt-n-Pepa & En Vogue | "Whatta Man" |
| 2 | Bruce Springsteen | "Streets of Philadelphia" |
| 2 | Me'Shell NdegéOcello | "If That's Your Boyfriend (He Wasn't Last Night)" |
| 2 | Nine Inch Nails | "Closer" |
| 2 | Peter Gabriel | "Kiss That Frog" |
| 2 | The Smashing Pumpkins | "Disarm" |
| 2 | Us3 | "Cantaloop (Flip Fantasia)" |

== See also ==
- 1994 MTV Europe Music Awards
