= Boheme (album) =

Studio album by Deep Forest
- Released: 20 June 1995
- Genre: World music
- Length: 41:13
- Label: Sony Records
- Producer: Deep Forest

Deep Forest chronology
World Mix (1994)	Boheme (1995)	Comparsa (1998)

Professional ratings
Review scores
Source	Rating
Allmusic	3/5 stars

Boheme is the second studio album by the French duo Deep Forest. It mainly sampled Central European romani songs (i.e., the Bohemians, hence the name of the album) with electronic music. Hit singles included "Marta's Song" (featuring Márta Sebestyén) and "Freedom Cry". The album became the duo's most successful one, selling over four million copies, receiving Diamond, Platinum and Gold awards in 15 countries and winning the Grammy Award for Best World Music Album.

The song "Freedom Cry" caused controversy when it was revealed that the singer Károly Rostás ("Huttyán") never received any monetary compensation, and neither did his family after he died in 1986, though his singing, archived by Claude Flagel, was sampled on the track. Flagel allegedly paid Huttyán 1,500 Ft (about US$30 in 1986) for the recording. The case was later documented in a movie titled Huttyán, released in 1996. Rostás's relatives did eventually succeed in obtaining some money from Deep Forest.

== Track listing ==
1. "Anasthasia" – 1:48
2. "Bohemian Ballet" – 5:15
3. "Marta's Song" (feat. Márta Sebestyén) – 4:13
4. "Gathering" – 4:39
5. "Lament" – 3:09
6. "Bulgarian Melody" (feat. Márta Sebestyén) – 3:09
7. "Deep Folk Song" – 1:13
8. "Freedom Cry" (feat. Károly Rostás) – 3:17
9. "Twosome" (feat. Márta Sebestyén) – 4:06
10. "Cafe Europa" – 4:17
11. "Katharina" – 2:53
12. "Boheme" – 4:37
13. "While the Earth Sleeps" (European Edition Bonus Track, feat. Peter Gabriel) – 6:23

== Reception ==
Much like Deep Forest's debut album, Boheme is a combination of club music and worldbeat. While the album is certainly danceable, it works better as trance-inducing mood music, although it isn't quite as consistent as the debut.

— Stephen Thomas Erlewine, [CD] Deep Forest: Bohême, All-Music Guide

A beautiful, radical fusion can be found on Deep Forest's latest release, Boheme (550/Sony). Their previous record also concentrated on the indigenous pygmies of central Africa. This one takes a great deal of inspiration from Eastern Europe as well. It heavily samples Marta Sebestyen (late of Muzsikas) and they actually have her sing one track to order. These guys have taken the art of the remix to a new plateau. As the acid jazz group United Future Organization does in its milieu, Deep Forest takes elements from non-Western music. Through studio alchemy, they create something original enough that they can get away with calling it their own.

— Hank Bordowitz, e.Bop - World Music Revis

== Charts ==
=== Weekly charts ===
Chart (1995–1996)	Peak position
Australian Albums (ARIA)	8
Belgian Albums (Ultratop Wallonia)	22
Canada Top Albums/CDs (RPM)	32
Dutch Albums (Album Top 100)	84
Europe (European Top 100 Albums)	35
German Albums (Offizielle Top 100)	82
Hungarian Albums (MAHASZ)	13
New Zealand Albums (RMNZ)	1
Norwegian Albums (VG-lista)	7
Scottish Albums (Official Charts)	31
Swedish Albums (Sverigetopplistan)	38
Swiss Albums (Schweizer Hitparade)	18
UK Albums (Official Charts)	12

== Certifications and sales ==
Region	Certification	Certified units/sales
Australia (ARIA)	Gold	35,000^{^}
France (SNEP)	Gold	100,000^{*}
New Zealand (RMNZ)	Platinum	15,000^{^}
Poland (ZPAV)	Gold	50,000^{*}
United Kingdom (BPI)	Silver	60,000^{^}
^{*} Sales figures based on certification alone.^{^} Shipments figures based on certification alone.
