= Dear Jassi =

2023 drama film

- Directed by: Tarsem Singh
- Written by: Amit Rai
- Produced by: Rajesh Bahl; Sanjay Grover; Bhushan Kumar; Krishan Kumar; Vipul D. Shah; Tarsem Singh; Ashwin Varde
- Starring: Pavia Sidhu; Yugam Sood
- Cinematography: Brendan Galvin
- Edited by: Tarsem Singh
- Music by: Kanwar Grewal
- Production companies: Creative Strokes Productions; Infinitum Productions; Oedipus Productions; T-Series; Wakaoo Films
- Release date: 11 September 2023 (TIFF)
- Running time: 132 minutes
- Countries: India; Canada; United States
- Languages: Punjabi; English

Dear Jassi is a 2023 drama film directed by Tarsem Singh and written by Amit Rai. A coproduction of companies from India, Canada and the United States, the film is based on the real-life story of Jaswinder Kaur Sidhu, a Punjabi Canadian woman who ran afoul of her family when she fell in love with and chose to marry a working-class man they did not approve of.

The film stars Pavia Sidhu as Jassi and Yugam Sood as her love interest Mithu, as well as Gourav Sharma, Sukhwinder Chahal, Sunita Dhir, Baljinder Kaur, Karan Arora, Abhinash Bachchan, Kam Bains, Paras Bajaj, Rajni Bajaj, Avni Batra, Ranjodh Beli, Aman Bhogal, Harinder Bhullar, Mahabir Bhullar, Suchi Birgi and Roopa Cheema in supporting roles.

== Critical response ==
Charles Bramesco of The Guardian wrote that "Like so many high school theater iconoclasts before him, Tarsem differentiates his iteration of Shakespeare's dog-eared narrative through context, in this instance the byzantine Kafka nightmare of immigration. On top of the animosity from Jassi's parents, border control agents conspire to keep our lovers apart after Jassi is sent back to the Great White North, separating them with a wall of documents, deadlines and fees. At every stage, a brutal khaki-clad police force can and must be bribed to forge papers, look the other way or do just about anything else. The emotional peaks rise not from the main couple's ardor, but from the extraordinary fortitude and determination that the simple act of moving from one country to another demands of ordinary citizens. Forced to navigate an intentionally discouraging institution with minimal guidance, a brazenly unjust series of hurdles designed to devalue and restrict life itself, Mithu hits more poignant notes in his fight for the freedom of mobility than in his quest for his beloved."

For Screen Daily, Tim Grierson wrote that "Singh Dhandwar fashions lovely moments when this pair's relationship first blossoms. Especially satisfying is the contrast between the homes where Jassi's and Mithu's families reside: hers is taller, and so when he stands on his rooftop to look up at her on her rooftop, it's a clever visual allusion to Romeo and Juliet's famous balcony scene. But like Shakespeare, Dear Jassi is heading toward heartbreak, with the filmmaker delivering the brutal final scenes without sensationalism."

On the review aggregator website Rotten Tomatoes, 88% of 17 critics' reviews are positive.

== Distribution ==
The full extent of the story, and the fact that it ultimately revolved around a murder, were not promoted in advance of the premiere, so as to heighten the initial impact of the twist in what had been presented in the early marketing as a simple romance film.

The film premiered at the 2023 Toronto International Film Festival, where it was named the winner of the Platform Prize. In his acceptance speech, Singh made an impassioned plea for media to stop using the term "honor killing" in relation to stories like Jassi's, on the grounds that it can create the impression that the murder was justifiable.
