= Nižepole =

Nižepole Нижеполе Nijopolea Xhinxhepolë
- Village
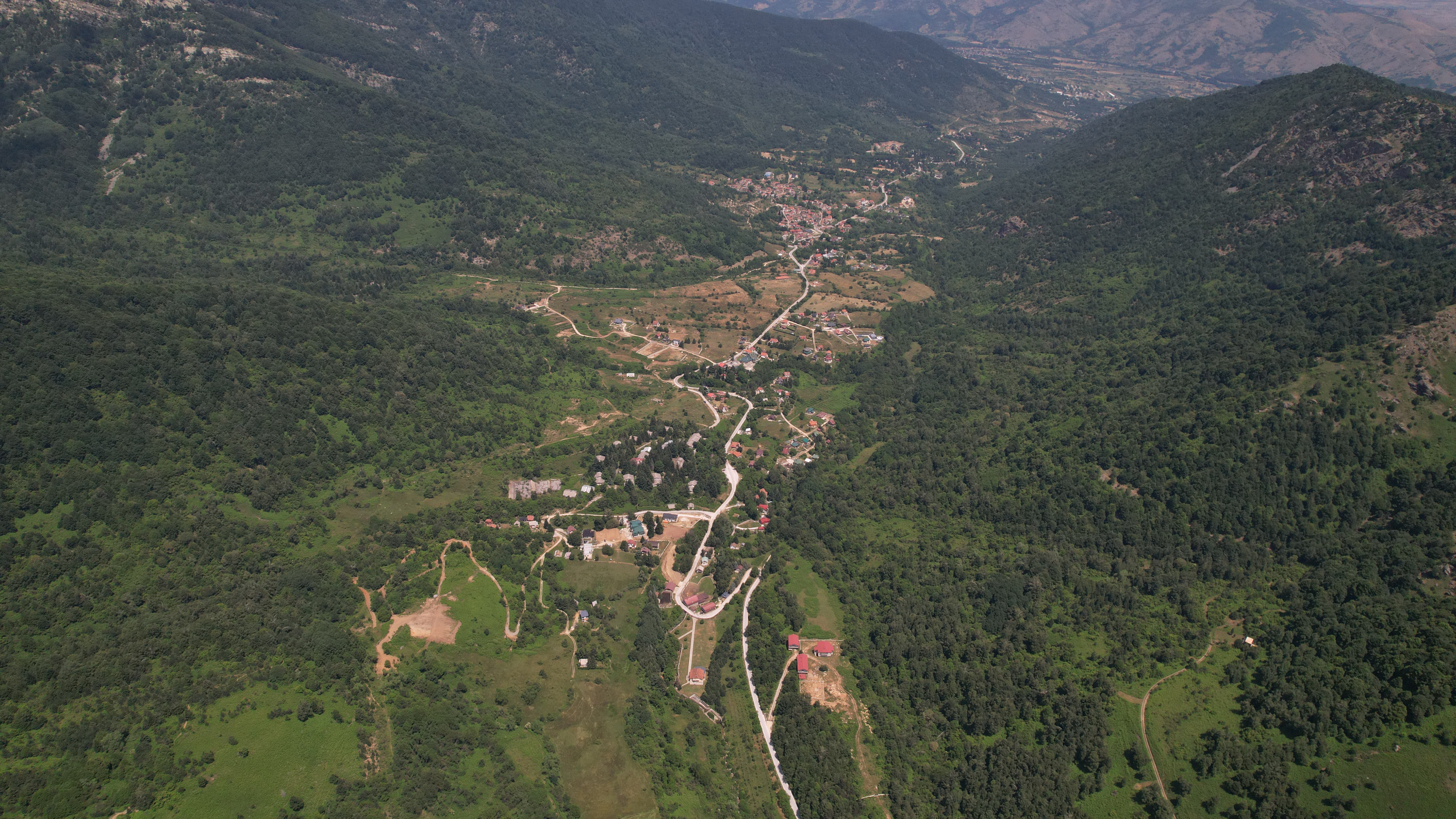
- Air view of the village

- Location within North Macedonia
- Coordinates: 41°00′38″N 21°14′43″E
- Country: North Macedonia
- Region: Pelagonia
- Municipality: Bitola

Population (2002)
  - Total: 186
- Time zone: UTC+1 (CET)
  - Summer (DST): UTC+2 (CEST)
- Postal code: 7223
- Area code: +389 47
- Car plates: BT
- Website: .

Nižepole (Macedonian: Нижеполе, Aromanian: Nijopolea, Albanian: Xhinxhopolë) is a village in the municipality of Bitola, North Macedonia, and is an alpine settlement 7.85 kilometers from Bitola located on the slopes of Baba Mountain near the peaks of Pelister.

== History ==
The population of Nižepole was made up of older inhabitants of Aromanians (Vlachs) and later Arvanito-Vlachs who formed a large part of the village population. A small number of Muslim Albanians over time settled in Nižepole originating from the Korçë region. During the first World War, Nižepole fell on the Allied side of the Macedonian front and its Aromanian villagers first fled to Florina and then most went to Katerini, Greece. After the war, most Nižepole Aromanians preferred to remain in Katerini after a few returnees came back telling of the destruction of the village. Only in 1923 with the Population exchange between Greece and Turkey and arrival of Greek refugees after the Greco-Turkish War (1919–1922) did some Nižepole inhabitants return to the village.

A large population of the village would later migrate to Melbourne, Victoria, Australia from the late 1950's until the early 1990's, settling mainly in the northern suburbs of Pascoe Vale and Coburg. A smaller but still significant portion of the population would also migrate to the city of Rochester, New York, USA. These migrations coincided with the general rise of urban living in Macedonia, which saw the majority of remaining residents relocating to Bitola. As a result, a primarily ageing population is left as permanent residents of the village. In recent years, the village has become a holiday hot-spot, with a ski station attracting tourists from all over the country, as well as holiday homes or Vikendici being developed throughout the whole village.

== Demographics ==
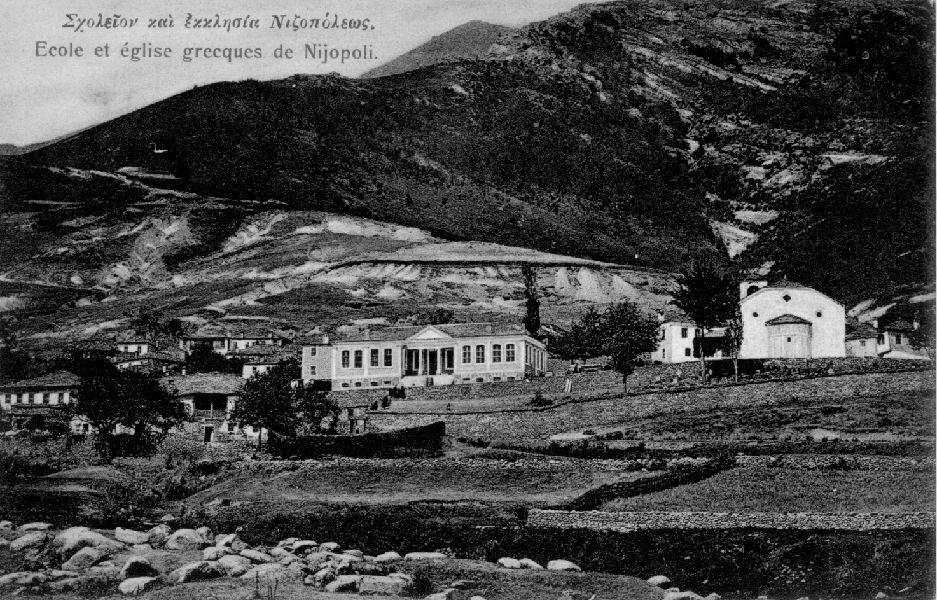
Nižepole, Greek language primary school and Orthodox church, early 20th century

Nižepole is attested in the Ottoman defter of 1467/68 as a village in the vilayet of Manastir. The inhabitants attested largely bore mixed Slavic-Albanian anthroponyms, such as Gerg son of Boris, Leko, or Gin son of Lavre.

In statistics gathered by Vasil Kanchov in 1900, the village of Nižepole was inhabited by 1590 Aromanians, 250 Orthodox Albanians and 190 Orthodox Bulgarians. According to the statistics of Bulgarian Exarchate secretary Dimitri Mishev (D. M. Brancoff), the town had a total Christian population of 940 in 1905, consisting of 780 Vlachs and 160 Patriarchist Bulgarians.

According to the 2002 census, the village had a total of 186 inhabitants. Ethnic groups in the village include:

- Vlachs 105
- Macedonians 47
- Albanians 30
- Romani 4

== Landmarks ==
=== Religious sites ===
- Sveta Petka (Saint Paraskeva) - the main church of the village, built in the mid-19th century
- Stã Viniri (Saint Paraskeva) - a small chapel located near the Grguli spring, built in 1838 in honour of the same saint as the main church, but differentiated by locals by using the Aromanian name for the saint
- Sveti Atanas (Saint Athanasius) - a church located under the Pelister peak and dating back to the 19th century
- Sveti Jovan Zlatoust (Saint John Chrystostom) - a church built in 2003 by Jovan Vraniškovski under the renegade Orthodox Ohrid Archbishopric, a former autonomous archbishopric of the Serbian Orthodox Church. The site was broken into by armed and masked men, who harassed and threatened nuns with machine guns, cut their hair and set the monastery on fire, in February 2004, and the church was demolished by state authorities in October 2004

=== Archaeological sites ===
- Gorno Selo (Upper Village) - a settlement from the Middle Ages
- Kaj Crkvata (At The Church) - a church and necropolis from the Middle Ages

=== Miscellaneous ===
- Dr Trifun Panovski Primary School - a school built in the courtyard of the Sveta Petka church in the late 19th century, using funds donated by a wealthy resident Konstantin Bebi on behalf of the Greek Patriarchate Church to teach the Greek language to locals, later named after the first doctor in the Macedonian Partisan movement
- Old French Road - a road built in World War I by French troops, leading to the Golemo Ezero (Big Lake), one of two lakes making up the Pelister Eyes

== Notable people ==
- Risto Pulevski, Aromanian singer and songwriter who wrote the famous Macedonian songs 'Tuginata pusta da ostane' and 'Da li znaeš mila majko' among many others, the latter of which lead to a global lawsuit when former Genesis frontman Peter Gabriel sampled the song in his track 'While the Earth Sleeps' and refused to acknowledge the original songwriter
- Kosta Colakovski-Stanko, Aromanian participant of the Macedonian Partisan movement, bearer of a street in Bitola in his namesake
- Vasil Canoski, participant of the Macedonian Partisan movement
- Gjorgji Zisovski, Aromanian participant of the Macedonian Partisan movement
- Vasko Taskovski, surrealist painter of wide renown throughout the Balkans
- Gena Nakovska, Aromanian poet
- Josif Petrovski, participant of the Macedonian Partisan movement
- Dimche Milevski Dobri, participant of the Macedonian Partisan movement, bearer of a partisan monument
- Theodoros Adam, Greek chieftain of the Macedonian Struggle
- The founders and committee of Pascoe Vale Pelister FC, a semi-professional football club in Melbourne, Australia
