= Theodoros Adam =

Greek soldier

Kapetan (Chieftain) Theodoros Adam
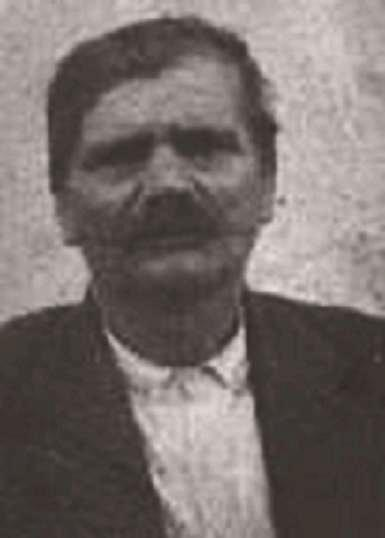
- Native name: Θεόδωρος Αδάμ
- Born: Late 1800s Nižepole, Monastir Vilayet, Ottoman Empire (now Republic of North Macedonia)
- Allegiance: Kingdom of Greece
- Service / branch: HMC
- Battles / wars: Macedonian Struggle

Theodoros Adam (Greek: Θεόδωρος Αδάμ) was a Greek chieftain of the Macedonian Struggle.

== Biography ==
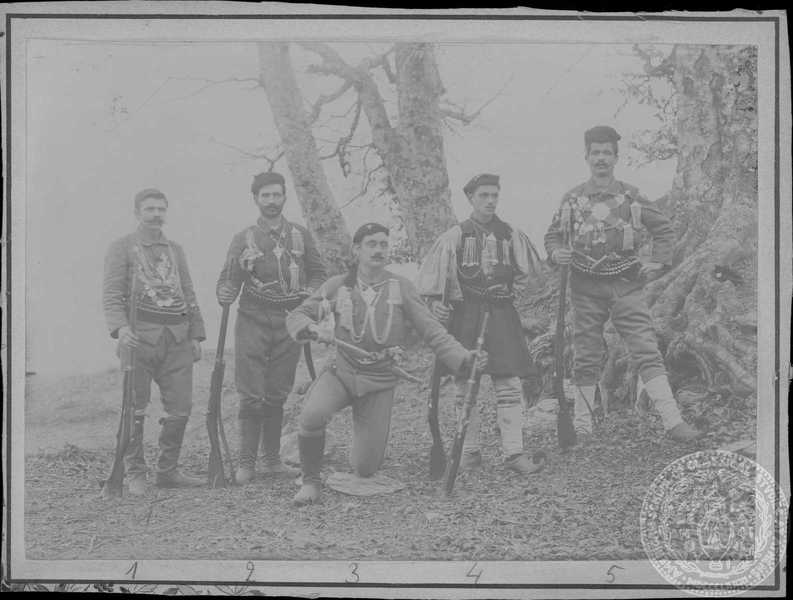
The Macedonian chieftains Theodoros Adam, Georgios Kouris and others from their group, 1908-1909.

Adam was born in the late 19th century in Nižepole, then part of the Ottoman Empire (now in North Macedonia). He organized the National Committee of his hometown, Nižepole very early (before 1903) and set up an armed group headed by himself. Its purpose was to face Bulgarian armed action in the areas of Pelagonia and Florina until 1904, when officers arrived from free Greece.

Later, his group cooperated in many operations with the Cretan officer Ioannis Karavitis until 1907. In 1908, his group, consisting mainly of Nižepole locals, under the general instructions of the Cretan Panagiotis Gerogiannis, dealt with multiple Bulgarian armed groups.

His actions continued until the First Balkan War in 1912 and after the Young Turk Revolution, as Bulgarian armed groups continued to fight in the Pelagonia area.

== Sources ==
- John S. Koliopulos (editor), Αφανείς, γηγενείς Μακεδονομάχοι, Εταιρεία Μακεδονικών Σπουδών, University Studio Press, Thessaloniki, 2008, p. 175
- Georgios Pitsivas (editor), Ιωάννη Καραβίτη, Ο Μακεδονικός Αγών, Athens 1994, volume II, p. 721
- Konstantinos A. Vakalopoulos, Εθνοτική Διαπάλη στη Μακεδονία (1894 – 1904), Η Μακεδονία στις παραμονές του Μακεδονικού Αγώνα, Irodotos, Thessaloniki, 1999, p. 344
- Το δοξασμένο Μοναστήρι: ήτοι, ιστορία της πατριωτικής δράσεως της πόλεως Μοναστηρίου και των περιχώρων από του έτους 1830 μέχρι του 1903, Παντελή Γ. Τσάλλη, Κεντρική Επιτροπή διά την διάδοσιν της Ιστορίας του Μοναστηρίου, Thessaloniki 1932, p. 85
