= Comparsa (album) =

Studio album by Deep Forest
- Released: 9 December 1997
- Recorded: 1997
- Genre: World music
- Length: 46:35
- Label: 550
- Producer: Deep Forest

Deep Forest chronology
Boheme (1995)	Comparsa (1997)	Made in Japan (1999)

Professional ratings
Review scores
Source	Rating
AllMusic	3/5 stars

Comparsa is the third studio release by the musical group Deep Forest in December 1997. This album mixes world music and ethnic sounds, including Cuban rhythms, mixed with electronic instruments. After the release of the album, Deep Forest arranged a highly successful world tour. Comparsa became #8 French export album of 1997 and was certified Platinum by SNEP Export Awards, with more than 500,000 albums sold outside France.

== Track listing ==
1. "Noonday Sun" – 4:59
2. "Green and Blue" – 4:53
3. "Madazulu" – 3:23
4. "1716" – 1:03
5. "Deep Weather" – 4:54
6. "Comparsa" – 4:58
7. "Earthquake (Transition 1)" – 0:48
8. "Tres Marias" – 4:53
9. "Radio Belize" – 3:58
10. "Ekue Ekue" – 5:20
11. "La Lune Se Bat Avec Les Étoiles (Transition 2)" – 2:27
12. "Forest Power" – 3:47
13. "Media Luna" – 4:32
14. "Alexi" (Japanese Edition Bonus Track)
15. "Freedom Cry" (Japanese Edition Bonus Track)

Bonus Disc:

1. "Sweet Lullaby (Remix)"
2. "Deep Forest (RLP Trance Mix)"
3. "Marta's Song (Armand's Muslim Moose Mix)"
4. "Madazulu (BBE Harmonic Club Mix)"

== Personnel ==
- Eric Mouquet – arrangement, keyboards, programming
- Michel Sanchez – arrangement, keyboards, programming
- Ana Torroja – vocals on "Media Luna"
- Jorge Reyes (musician) – percussion, vocals, and flute
- Joe Zawinul – synthesizer on "Deep Weather"

== Reception ==
Deep Forest's third album Comparsa continues the world-music potpourri Deep Forest is known for, though there is a pronounced focus on Latin and Caribbean grooves, provided by musicians from Cuba, Belize, Mexico and Madagascar, among other places. Although the nationalities present are truly global, the actual sound of Deep Forest hasn't changed that much, centering mostly on lush new age music with just a bit more of an edge than is usual, plus several tracks with whispered or restrained vocals. For fans of the debut album, Comparsa is a noteworthy, though hardly necessary, acquisition.

— John Bush, All-Music Guide

Although it could be too soon to make this call, Deep Forest just may have produced the house cleaning album of the year. Their third album, Comparsa, contains the kind of bouncy, mindless fun that whisks one away from the task at hand to infinite and impossibly exotic distances. This is not to say the music itself is mindless, so much as the entire experience is akin to watching a foreign film sans subtitles. The album does contain raw emotions like joy, anger, hope and despair that, whether shrieked by pygmies or chanted by nomads, ring clear as a bell. This is a testament to Deep Forest's voiceless musical duo, Eric Mouquet and Michel Sanchez, who trot the globe as self described "sound reporters," but also to the universality of music itself. A lyric sheet in the liner notes would provide a welcome Rosetta stone for those interested in forging beyond the pure exotica of the listening experience, but one is occasionally tipped off by titles like "Radio Belize." With influences as geographically diverse as Cuba and Madagascar and musically varied as zydeco and polka, one is in for quite a bumpy ride, but that could be more of a beef with the world music genre than this particular album which is well produced and exhilarating. And although these songs may not be showing up on the neighborhood karaoke machine anytime soon, dust bunnies are already quaking with fear.

— Tony Phillips, VH1 Online

== Charts ==
=== Weekly charts ===
Chart (1998)	Peak position
Hungarian Albums (MAHASZ)	17
