= While the Earth Sleeps =

1995 single by Deep Forest and Peter Gabriel

Single by Deep Forest with Peter Gabriel

from the album Strange Days - Music From The Motion Picture
- B-side: "Rid of Me", performed by Juliette Lewis
- Released: 1995
- Genre: Electronic
- Length: 3:50 (album version), 6:22 (long version)
- Label: Columbia
- Songwriters: Eric Mouquet, Michel Sanchez, Peter Gabriel
- Producers: Eric Mouquet, Michel Sanchez, Peter Gabriel

Deep Forest singles chronology
"Marta's Song" (1995)	"While the Earth Sleeps" (1995)	"Bohemian Ballet" (1996)

Peter Gabriel singles chronology
"Red Rain (live)" (1994)	"While the Earth Sleeps" (1996)	"When You're Falling" (2001)

"While the Earth Sleeps" is a song written by Eric Mouquet and Michel Sanchez of Deep Forest and Peter Gabriel. The song was performed by Deep Forest with Peter Gabriel and appeared on the soundtrack for the film Strange Days (1995), where it was played over the film's end credits. The song was also released as a CD single.

== Background ==
The song incorporates credited samples from "Shashvi, Kakabi", performed by Tsinandali Choir, and "Övgön Chuuvuu" from Mongolie, Musique Vocale et Instrumentale. The passage "Dali znaesh, mila mayko" (Дали знаеш мила майко) (Do you know, dear mother?) comes from the Bulgarian folk song "Dali Znaesh, Mila Mayko". The song is from the album Bulgarie : Chants et danses (Bulgaria: Songs and dances) using the sampled voice of Bulgarian singer Katya Petrova.

The song was first recorded in 1962 by Cveta and Petar Pavlovski and became popular in SR Macedonia in part because one of the verses is considered to be in the country's native language. Risto Pulevski from Nižepole, North Macedonia claimed that the lyrics of the song were in the Macedonian language and said that he felt "insulted" when he heard Gabriel describe the song as Bulgarian. Pulevski asserted that he wrote the lyrics to the song in 1960 and that it was "neither Bulgarian nor a folksong". He threatened legal action unless Gabriel acknowledged the alleged authorship.

According to Gabriel's publicist, Gabriel had previously approached Deep Forest to determine if the song had been cleared for copyright. A publicist for Deep Forest said that they compensated the French record company Arion for the "Dali Znaesh, Mila Mayko" sample, although Arion believed that the sample was in the public domain. Pulevski's claim has never been corroborated and no legal action followed.

== Track listing ==
No.	Title	Writer(s)	Notes	Length
1.	"While the Earth Sleeps" (album version)	Eric Mouquet, Michel Sanchez, Peter Gabriel		3:50
2.	"Rid of Me"	PJ Harvey	performed by Juliette Lewis, produced by Daniel Rey and Randy Gerston	4:13
3.	"While the Earth Sleeps" (long version)	Mouquet, Sanchez, Gabriel	CD maxi-single only	6:22

"Rid of Me" is featured in the film Strange Days, but not on the soundtrack.
