= Music Detected =

Studio album by Deep Forest
- Released: 14 May 2002
- Genres: Dub; ambient
- Length: 58:00
- Label: Saint George SAN 5063552
- Producers: Eric Mouquet; Michel Sanchez

Deep Forest chronology
Pacifique (2001)	Music Detected (2002)	Kusa No Ran (2004)

Music Detected is the fifth studio album by the French musical group Deep Forest. It was released on 14 May 2002, via the Saint George label.

== Track listing ==
All songs by Éric Mouquet and Michel Sanchez

1. "India" – 4:07
2. "Endangered Species" – 6:18
3. "Soul Elevator" – 4:12
4. "Computer Machine" – 5:12
5. "Yuki Song" (featuring Beverly Jo Scott) – 5:23
6. "Beauty in Your Eyes" – 4:23
7. "Elemental" (featuring Beverly Jo Scott) – 5:24
8. "Far East" – 0:58
9. "Deep Blue Sea" (featuring Anggun) – 4:16
10. "Will You Be Ready" (featuring Chitose Hajime and Angela McCluskey) – 5:18
11. "In the Evening" – 1:36
12. "Dignity" (featuring Beverly Jo Scott) – 5:23
13. "Endangered Species (Galleon Remix Radio Edit)" – 3:59
14. "Tokyo Street" (Japanese Edition Bonus Track)
15. "Honjo Song" (Previously Unreleased)

== Charts ==
Chart (2000)	Peak position
French Albums (SNEP)	125
US Top Electronic Albums (Billboard)	14
US Top World Music Albums (Billboard)	5

== Personnel ==
- Éric Mouquet – arrangement, keyboards, programming
- Michel Sanchez – arrangement, keyboards, programming
- Beverly Jo Scott – vocals
- Angela McCluskey – vocals on "Will You Be Ready"
- Chitose Hajime – vocals on "Will You Be Ready"
- Anggun – vocals on "Deep Blue Sea"
- David Fall – drums
- Phillipe Paradis – guitar
- Brij Narayan – sarod
