= Deep Africa =

Studio album by Deep Forest
- Released: April 2, 2013
- Genres: Electronic, World Music
- Label: Station 5 3717526
- Producer: Deep Forest/Eric Mouquet

Deep Forest chronology
Deep India (2013)	Deep Africa (2013)

Deep Africa is a studio album by Eric Mouquet of the French duo Deep Forest released in 2013 by the label Station 5. It contains vocal samples and singing in various African languages. The album features African singers such as Blick Bassy and Wasis Diop.

== Track listing ==
1. Amber Opening - 3:15
2. Dub Africa - 2:44
3. Mosika - 5:13
4. Yelele - 4:17
5. Bedi - 4:31
6. Atali Wowo - 4:44
7. Wasis - 6:55
8. Zoulawa - 3:48
9. Ho Mambo - 3:33
10. Alaake - 3:38
11. Lomo - 1:00
12. How Long It Takes? - 6:38
13. Tiko - 4:42
14. Mosika Ending - 1:08

=== US bonus tracks ===
1. Mawa (Bonus Track) - 3:02
2. Soweto (Bonus Track) - 4:28
3. Dub Africa (Gaudi Remix) - 7:31

Note
The US edition of this CD contains three bonus tracks.
