= Tarsem Singh =

Indian film director (born 1961)

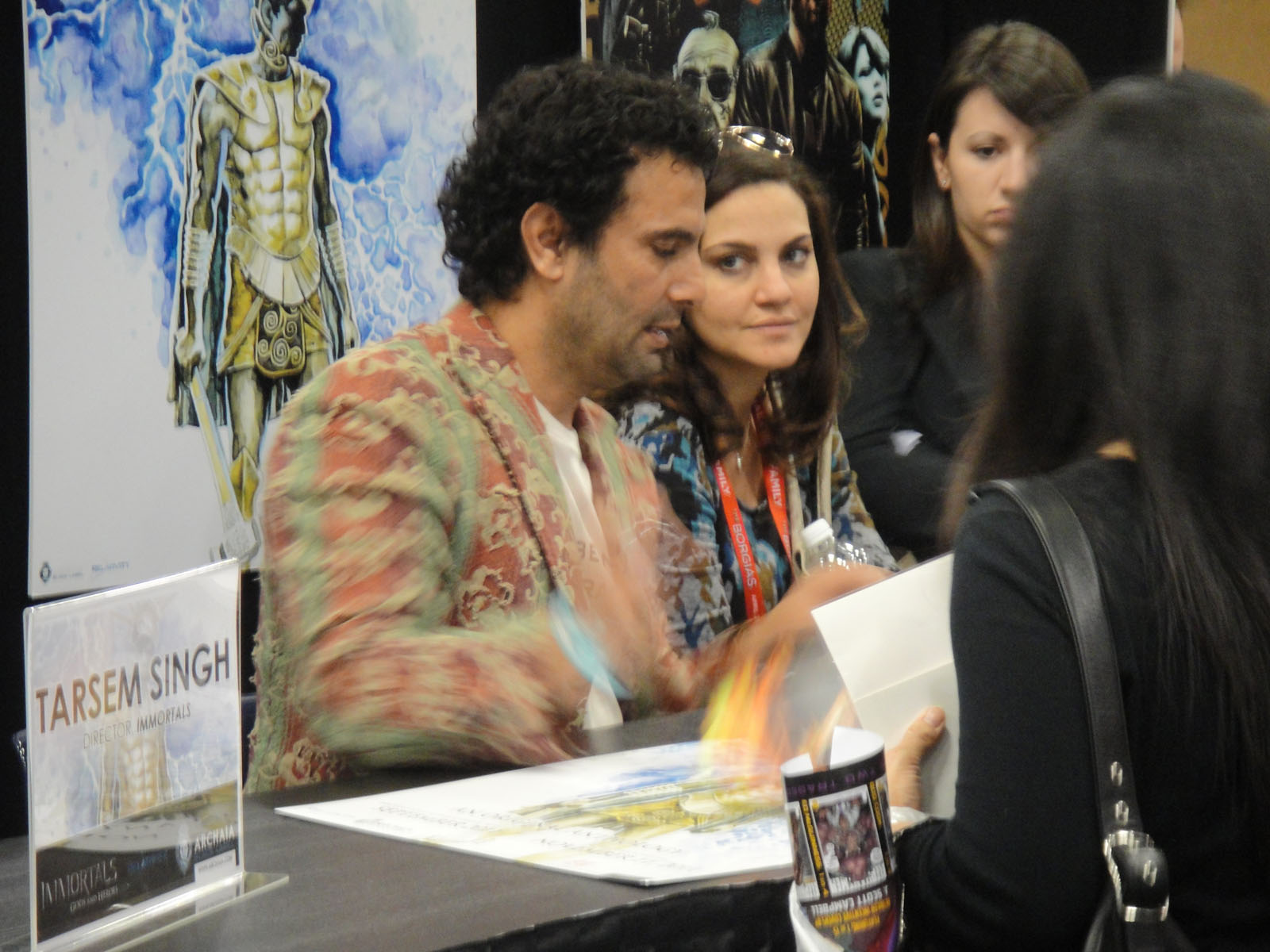
- Singh at WonderCon 2011
- Born: Tarsem Singh Dhandwar; 26 May 1961 (age 65); Jalandhar, Punjab, India
- Other name: Tarsem
- Occupations: Film director; producer; screenwriter
- Years active: 1990–present
- Website: www.tarsem.org

Tarsem Singh Dhandwar (born 26 May 1961), known professionally as Tarsem, is an Indian director who has worked on films, music videos, and commercials. He directed The Cell (2000), The Fall (2006), Immortals (2011), Mirror Mirror (2012), Self/less (2015), and Dear Jassi (2023).

== Early life ==
Tarsem was born in Jalandhar, Punjab to a Punjabi Sikh family. His father was an aircraft engineer. He attended Bishop Cotton School in Shimla, Hans Raj College in Delhi, and is a graduate of the Art Center College of Design in Pasadena, California. Singh's classmates included future film directors Michael Bay and Zack Snyder. Singh also acted in the student films of Bay and Snyder, including playing a Nazi in one of the latter's works.

== Career ==
Tarsem began his career by directing music videos, including those of "Hold On" by En Vogue, "Sweet Lullaby" by Deep Forest and R.E.M.'s "Losing My Religion", the latter of which won Best Music Video, Short Form at the 1992 Grammy Awards. He has directed commercials for brands such as Nike and Coca-Cola. Tarsem's feature film directorial debut was The Cell (2000), starring Jennifer Lopez.

In 2003, Tarsem directed one of the most elaborate Pepsi commercials to date. It combined a gladiator theme with Queen's "We Will Rock You". The commercial starred Enrique Iglesias in the version of the commercial aired in Europe and North America and Amr Diab in the version aired in the Arab world.

Tarsem's second film, The Fall, debuted at the 2006 Toronto International Film Festival and was released in theatres in the United States in 2008. His third film was 2011's Immortals which he directed for Relativity Media and Universal Pictures. He directed an adaptation of the Brothers Grimm story of "Snow White", called Mirror Mirror (2012).

In 2020, Tarsem made his return to music videos with Lady Gaga's single "911", his first in 26 years.

In 2021, his Super Bowl ad for Toyota featuring the adoption of US Paralympian Jessica Long won significant critical acclaim. He also directed the Microsoft Windows 11 commercial Journey which featured the song "Brings You Closer to What You Love" by Odessa, an appearance by Master Chief from Halo (Xbox) and dancers emerging through a painting by Clifford Bailey.

His 2023 film Dear Jassi premiered at the 2023 Toronto International Film Festival, where it was the winner of the Platform Prize.

== Filmography ==
=== Film ===
Year	Title	Director	Producer	Writer
2000	The Cell	Yes	No	No
2006	The Fall	Yes	Yes	Yes
2011	Immortals	Yes	No	No
2012	Mirror Mirror	Yes	No	No
2015	Self/less	Yes	No	No
2023	Dear Jassi	Yes	Yes	No

=== Television ===
Year	Title	Director	Executive Producer	Notes
2017	Emerald City	Yes	Yes	10 episodes

=== Music video ===
- Suzanne Vega - "Tired of Sleeping" (1990)
- En Vogue – "Hold On" (1990)
- R.E.M. – "Losing My Religion" (1991)
- The Dream Academy – "Love" (1991)
- Dream Warriors – "My Definition of a Boombastic Jazz Style" (1991)
- Deep Forest – "Sweet Lullaby" (1994)
- Lady Gaga – "911" (2020)

=== Commercials ===
- Levi's – "Swimmer" (1992)
- Smirnoff – "Message in a Bottle" (1992)
- McEwan's Export – "Countdown" (1992)
- Vauxhall Corsa – "Side Impact Bar" (1993)
- Opel Corsa – "Supermodels" (1993)
- Opel Corsa – "Naomi" (1993)
- Audi – "Men have a Soul" (1993)
- Vauxhall Corsa – "Supermodels" (1993)
- Kellogg's Corn Pops – "Catch" (1993)
- Milk Tray – "Chess" (1994)
- Volkswagen – "Blob" (1994)
- Mulino Bianco – "Roma" (1994)
- Mulino Bianco – "Firenze" (1994)
- Mulino Bianco – "Venezia" (1994)
- Audi – "Dress" (1994)
- Coca-Cola – "Batsman" (1995)
- Coca-Cola – "Bowler - Pakistan" (1995)
- Coca-Cola – "Bowler" (1995)
- Coca-Cola – "Fielder - Pakistan" (1995)
- Coca-Cola – "Fielder" (1995)
- Nike – "Good versus Evil" (1995)
- Audi A6 Avant – "Goodbye" (1995)
- Isuzu – "Paris Dakar" (1995)
- Levi's – "Washroom" (1996)
- Infiniti – "Masquerade" (1996)
- Infiniti – "Wedding" (1996)
- Infiniti – "Restaurant" (1996)
- Infiniti – "Jazz Club" (1996)
- Infiniti – "Bridge" (1996)
- Infiniti – "Park" (1996)
- Infiniti – "Movie Theatre" (1996)
- Sprint PCS – "Romans" (1996)
- Sprint PCS – "Egyptians" (1996)
- Sprint PCS – "Incas" (1996)
- Superga – "The Challenge" (1996)
- MTV – "Food for Thought" (1996)
- Coca-Cola – "Cricket" (1996)
- D2 Privat – "Telephone" (1997)
- Mastercard – "Anniversary in India" (1997)
- Mercedes-Benz – "Trick" (1997)
- Audi A6 – "Visions" (1997)
- Schweppes – "Diamond Mine" (1997)
- Reebok – "Storm" (1997)
- Nike – "Foreign Legion" (1997)
- John Hancock – "Saravejo" (1997)
- Levi's – "They Go On" (6-part ad series) (1997)
- Miller Lite – "Pro Wrestlers" (1997)
- Volvo V70 – "The Ice Hotel" (1998)
- Beck's – "Romance" (1998)
- Beck's – "Laid Back" (1998)
- Beck's – "Comedy" (1998)
- Philips – "Rain" (1998)
- Philips – "Idiot" (1998)
- Philips – "The Pool Boy" (1998)
- Philips – "Kiss" (1998)
- Mercedes – "Orchestra Leader" (1998)
- GMC Envoy – "Tunnel" (1998)
- GMC Envoy – "Steel Mill" (1998)
- Volkswagen – "Pursuit of Excellence" (1998)
- Campari – "Scratch" (1998)
- Nike – "Beach Boys" (1998)
- Conseco – "Boxer" (1998)
- Conseco – "Italian Woman" (1998)
- Honda – "Honda Accord V6 - Happy Cat" (1998)
- Volvo – "Lift off" (1999)
- France Telecom – "Little Boy" (1999)
- Absolut Vodka – "Beat Crazy" (1999)
- Coca-Cola – "Outsiders" (1999)
- Coca-Cola – "Running to the Store" (1999)
- Audi A8 – "Fate" (1999)
- Pepsi – "Foosball" (2000)
- Pepsi – "Shirt" (2000)
- Levi's – "Dockers - E-Train" (2000)
- Got Milk – "Superheroes" (2000)
- Miller – "On the Run" (2000)
- Miller – "Haircut" (2000)
- Miller – "Love Thy Neighbour" (2000)
- Go.com – "Crawl Space" (2000)
- Go.com – "Be Do Be Do" (2000)
- Go.com – "Barn" (2000)
- Go.com – "Ceiling Tile" (2000)
- Nike – "Gladiator" (2000)
- Nike – "The Mission" (2000)
- HSBC – "Running" (2000)
- HSBC – "Train" (2000)
- Pepsi – "Beckham" (2001)
- Mountain Dew – "Duo" (2001)
- Beck's – "Engineer's Night Out" (2001)
- Bacardi – "Kiss" (2001)
- Bacardi – "Laugh" (2001)
- Bacardi – "Lipstick" (2001)
- Bacardi – "Groove" (2001)
- Bacardi – "Move" (2001)
- Bacardi – "Closing Time" (2001)
- Orange – "Leo" (2001)
- Orange – "Football" (2001)
- Telewest – "Cemetery" (2001)
- Ericsson – "Flowers" (2001)
- Ericsson – "Reception" (2001)
- Martini – "Mission" (2001)
- Becks – "Technicians Night Out" (2001)
- Becks – "Frisbee" (2001)
- Becks – "Barmaid" (2001)
- Becks – "Accordion" (2001)
- BMW Compact – "Home" (2001)
- Pepsi – "Kung Fu" (2002)
- Pepsi – "Sumo" (2002)
- Pepsi – "Sumo Rematch" (2002)
- Campari – "The Duel" (2002)
- Wanadoo – "Positive Generation" (2002)
- T-Mobile – "Anthem" (2002)
- T-Mobile – "Czech" (2002)
- T-Mobile – "Italian" (2002)
- T-Mobile – "Bored" (2002)
- Nationwide – "Every Minute – Football" (2002)
- Gatorade – "UV Labrats" (2002)
- Guinness – "Tom Crean" (2002)
- Orange – "Pictures" (2002)
- Orange – "Private Utopia" (2002)
- 7 UP – "Masseuses" (2002)
- Land Rover Freelander – "Gourd" (2002)
- Nationwide – "England Team" (2002)
- Nationwide – "Every Minute" (2002)
- McDonald's – "Being Six" (2002)
- Intel – "Moving Day" (2003)
- Intel – "Airport" (2003)
- Intel – "Diver" (2003)
- Pepsi – "Elephant Tower" (2003)
- Pepsi – "OK Corral" (2003)
- Pepsi – "Longer Nights" (2003)
- Renault – "Performance" (2003)
- Citroën – "Les Magiciens" (2003)
- Pepsi – "Gladiators" (2003)
- Vodafone – "Beckham Blue Skies" (2003)
- Pepsi – "Footbattle" (2003)
- Vodafone – "Ferrari Fan" (2003)
- Halifax – "Just a Little" (2003)
- Vodafone – "Lounge" (2003)
- Nissan Maxima – "Orange" (2003)
- Nissan Maxima – "Jogger" (2003)
- Nissan Maxima – "Cab" (2003)
- Intel – "Moving Day" (2003)
- Toyota Prius – "Move Forward / Standstill" (2003)
- Citroën – "Les Mains / The Painting" (2004)
- Pepsi – "Surf" (2004)
- Pepsi – "Wanted" (2004)
- Pepsi – "Samurai" (2004)
- Nike – "The Warriors" (2004)
- Verizon – "Togetherness" (2005)
- Verizon – "Glory" (2005)
- Verizon – "In" (2005)
- Verizon – "Adrenaline" (2005)
- Orange – "Louise" (2005)
- Campari – "The Wedding" (2005)
- Pepsi – "Party" (2005)
- Puma – "Body X" (2006)
- Cisco Systems – "Anthem" (2006)
- Acura – "Rush" (2006)
- Pepsi – "Shuffle" (2006)
- Pepsi – "Pepsi Fest - Germany" (2006)
- Disney – "Anthem" (2006)
- Softbank – "India" (2006)
- Softbank – "Palace" (2006)
- T-Com – "Limitless" (2007)
- TUI – "Tagebuch" (2007)
- The Hartford – "200 Years in a Moment" (2007)
- Mercedes – "The Race" (2007)
- Magnum – "Prayers" (2007)
- EDF – "Doors" (2007)
- Nike – "Beautiful Focus" (2008)
- Nike – "Who Are You?" (2008)
- Volvo – "Discuss" (2008)
- Nestea – "Stamp" (2008)
- Nestea – "Temple" (2008)
- Cisco Systems – "Town Square" (2008)
- Cisco Systems – "The Shortest Commute" (2008)
- Gatorade – "Part I: Enchanter" (2009)
- Gatorade – "Part II: Hecklers" (2009)
- Gatorade – "Part III: Beware the Jabbawockeez" (2009)
- Gatorade – "Part IV: EGO" (2009)
- Gatorade – "Part V: Game 7" (2009)
- Yellowtale – "Tragedy" (2009)
- Palm Pre – "Anima" (2009)
- Fiat – "Fiat 500 - Docuspot" (2009)
- Islam Project – "Islam is Colours" (2009)
- Islam Project – "Islam is Refined" (2009)
- Islam Project – "Islam is Tolerant" (2009)
- Lay's – "Lay's Sensations - Lamb and Chili" (2009)
- Lay's – "Lay's Sensations - Mozzarella and Pesto" (2009)
- Bajaj Electricals – "BOTS" (2009)
- Kia – "Kia Forte - Pioneers" (2009)
- Kia – "Kia Soul - Hamsters" (2009)
- Dodge – "Snow" (2010)
- The Cosmopolitan – "Just the Right Amount of Wrong" (2010)
- Lancôme – "La Vie est Belle" (2012)
- McDonald's – "Court" (2013)
- Pepsi – "L.O.V.E." (2013)
- Pepsi – "Toast" (2013)
- Pepsi – "Come On" (2013)
- Sony – "Sony Xperia Z - The Gift of Sound and Vision" (2013)
- Morgan Stanley – "Anthem" (2013)
- Morgan Stanley – "Better Tomorrow" (2013)
- Morgan Stanley – "Pursuit of a Better Life" (2013)
- Mountain Dew – "Satellite" (2013)
- Miller Lite – "Cornermen" (2013)
- Carte Noir – "Fire & Ice" (2014)
- Samsung – "Samsung Galaxy S5 - Curiosity" (2014)
- Samsung – "Samsung Galaxy S5 - Time" (2014)
- Samsung – "Samsung Galaxy S5 - Moment" (2014)
- POM Wonderful – "Archers" (2014)
- POM Wonderful – "Cyclops" (2014)
- POM Wonderful – "Samurai" (2014)
- POM Wonderful – "Dragon" (2014)
- BMW – "Curiosity" (2014)
- BMW – "Unbridled Joy" (2015)
- Dubai Tourism – "Footprints" (2015)
- Cadillac – "ATS Coupe - Irresistible" (2015)
- Mountain Dew – "Tree Top" (2017)
- Samsung – "Infinitely Amazing" (2017)
- Taco Bell – "Masterpieces - Potato Burrito" (2017)
- Taco Bell – "Masterpieces - Queso Beef Nachos" (2017)
- Swisscom – "Best Net" (2018)
- Experian – "Old Way" (2018)
- Experian – "Days in the Life" (2018)
- Experian – "Drive Thru" (2018)
- Experian – "Scoreboard" (2018)
- Pepsi – "Aboudia" (2019)
- Pepsi – "Nayeli" (2019)
- Pepsi – "Hisham" (2019)
- Pepsi – "The Toys" (2019)
- Pepsi – "No Regrets" (2019)
- Dove – "Dove" (2019)
- Dove – "Cleopatra" (2019)
- Delta Air Lines – "Get Back to the World Safely" (2021)
- Toyota – "Upstream" (2021)
- Microsoft – "All Starts Now" (2021)
- Microsoft – "Windows 11 - Journey" (2021)
- Mountain View Egypt – "Bubble Buster" (2022)
- CrowdStrike – "Who Invited Gary?" (2023)
- CrowdStrike – "Troy" (2023)
