= Pacifique (album) =

2000 soundtrack album by Deep Forest

Studio album by Deep Forest
- Released: 12 December 2000
- Genre: Electronic; new age
- Length: 50:47
- Label: Saint George SAN 501241 2
- Producer: Deep Forest

Deep Forest chronology
Made in Japan (1998)	Pacifique (2000)	Music Detected (2002)

Pacifique is a soundtrack album by the French duo Deep Forest, released on 12 December 2000 in support of the film Le Prince du Pacifique. It mixes Pacific island beats with electronic music.

== Track listing ==
1. "Pacifique" – 3:47
2. "La Légende Part 2" – 4:04
3. "Night Village" – 4:10
4. "Le Réveil De Barnabé Part 1" – 1:07
5. "La Révolte" – 4:27
6. "Le Baiser" – 2:30
7. "Ouverture Huahiné" – 5:06
8. "L'ile Invisible" – 1:45
9. "La Legende Part 1" (French Edition Bonus Track) – 0:46
10. "Exécution" – 4:26
11. "Le Réveil De Barnabé Part 2" – 3:20
12. "Moon Light" – 3:21
13. "Téfaora Ne Croit Pas À La Légende" – 1:10
14. "La Veuve Furieuse" – 3:34
15. "Huahiné Reggae" – 6:01
16. "Huahiné Reggae Part 2" (Japanese Edition Bonus Track) – 2:05

== Credits ==
- Composition, instruments – Éric Mouquet, Michel Sanchez
- Engineering – Pierre Gamet
- Mastering, mixing – Pierre Jacquot
