= Made in Japan (Deep Forest album) =

Live album by Deep Forest
- Released: October 26, 1999
- Recorded: July 9, 1998
- Genre: World music
- Length: 1:05:34
- Label: Saint George SAN 494636 2
- Producer: Deep Forest

Deep Forest chronology
Comparsa (1997)	Made in Japan (1999)	Pacifique (2000)

Professional ratings
Review scores
Source	Rating
Allmusic	2.5/5 stars

Made in Japan is a live album by French group Deep Forest, released in 1999.

The recording took place on 9 July 1998, during Deep Forest's tour in Japan, with nine musicians joining the group on the stage. The band placed an emphasis on improvisation and playing the songs differently from the recordings. The voices of the three singers were mixed with pre-recorded samples. More than 150,000 copies of the album have been sold.

== Track listing ==
All tracks composed by Éric Mouquet and Michel Sanchez

1. "Ekue Ekue" – 5:18
2. "Green and Blue" – 6:00
3. "Deep Weather" – 6:16
4. "Tres Marias" (Japanese Edition Bonus Track) – 6:22
5. "Bohemian Ballet" – 6:16
6. "Deep Folk Song" – 2:26
7. "Freedom Cry" – 4:04
8. "Cafe Europa" – 5:48
9. "Forest Power" – 6:06
10. "Hunting" – 6:37
11. "Forest Hymn" – 5:22
12. "Sweet Lullaby" – 6:20
13. "White Whisper" (Japanese Edition Bonus Track) – 5:06
14. "Madazulu" – 5:01

== Personnel ==
- Didier Cresson - bass
- Neil Conti - drums
- Paolo Damanti - keyboards
- Michel Sanchez - keyboards, accordion, piano
- Éric Mouquet - keyboards, vocoder, Zendrums
- Fred Savinien-Caprais - percussion
- Gabrielle Raharimalala, Gino Ceccarelli, Monique Rasoanirina - vocals

Technical

- Yoshiyasu Kumada - recording
