= Sweet Lullaby =

1992 single by Deep Forest

Single by Deep Forest

from the album Deep Forest
- Released: 10 March 1992
- Genre: Dance; Europop; world beat
- Length: 3:55 (radio edit)
- Label: Dance Pool; Columbia; Epic
- Songwriters: Eric Mouquet; Michel Sanchez
- Producer: Dan Lacksman

Deep Forest singles chronology
"Sweet Lullaby" (1992)	"Deep Forest" (1993)

Music videos
- "Sweet Lullaby" on YouTube; "Sweet Lullaby" (alternative version) on YouTube

"Sweet Lullaby" is a song by French musical group Deep Forest that originally appeared on their eponymous album (1992). The song was produced by Dan Lacksman and was released as a single in 1992. It became a chart hit in several countries, including Australia, the Netherlands, Norway and the United Kingdom, where it entered the top 10. In 1994, it was re-released in remixed versions. The accompanying music video was directed by Tarsem Singh and filmed in eight countries. The video depicts the voyage of a young girl who travels the world by tricycle and was nominated for several awards at the 1994 MTV Video Music Awards.

== Background ==
Although the inlay misattributed the samples to African Pygmies, the song is based around "Rorogwela", a traditional Baegu lullaby from the Solomon Islands sung vocal sample by a woman, Afunakwa. Her singing was originally recorded by ethnomusicologist Hugo Zemp in 1970 and later released by UNESCO on the 1973 album Solomon Islands: Fateleka and Baegu Music from Malaita as part of their Musical Sources collection. The lyrics refer to a young orphan being comforted by his older brother despite the loss of their parents.

The recording was used without authorization from Afunakwa, Zemp, label UNESCO discs or distributor Auvidis, although Zemp had earlier reluctantly given oral permission for an unrelated recording to be used.

Deep Forest member Eric Mouquet said the lack of credit for Afunakwa was "very regrettable" and that producer Dan Lacksman was responsible for obtaining permission to use the sample. Lacksman said the responsibility belonged to Sony-owned label Celine Music.

Afunakwa's rendition of the lullaby was also reused by Italian disc jockey Mauro Picotto in his song "Komodo (Save a Soul)", and the tune was covered by Norwegian saxophonist Jan Garbarek, in his song erroneously titled "Pygmy Lullaby". Afunakwa died in 1987, being unable to escape a cyclone due to her advanced age.

For a time, Australian television network SBS used the song as its theme. It was also used by German television broadcaster RTL as the closing theme to their coverage of UEFA Champions League football during the 1994–95 season.

== Critical reception ==
In 1994, Larry Flick from Billboard magazine wrote, "This is one of those great projects that has created a long top-shelf life on its own. Now that the 2-year-old 'Sweet Lullaby' has finally run its course, Epic is focusing on the act's self-titled track, running it through the remix mill with sterling results. Myriad versions are included to ensure chances for consumption at several formats, ranging from mainstream club to crossover radio." Dave Sholin from the Gavin Report named it "haunting and captivating", adding, "It needs more than one listen." Another GR reviewer, Keith Zimmerman, constated that "with its Pygmy chant samplings, [it] churns out a soulful world beat groove that's plenty catchy enough to create a mass appeal hit." Chuck Campbell from Knoxville News Sentinel complimented it as a "gorgeous track", "which combines an angelic lead vocal with a sweeping chorus". In his weekly UK chart commentary, James Masterton said, "The musical collage they create is startlingly reminiscent of something One Dove may produce but after much club exposure they have outdone them at a stroke and are destined for the Top 10 next week at least." David Stubbs from Melody Maker named it the best track of the album, writing, "Driven by a rich, languid shuffle, it features a beautiful, lilting, ethnic chorus that's as refreshing as the burgeoning smell of wet leaves in the first rain after the drought. We're bombarded with product week in and week out up here but a record that lilts you is still rare. 'Sweet Lullaby' is one of them." Pan-European magazine Music & Media viewed the song as a "mellow floater".

M&M editor Dom Phillips wrote, "Pygmies, strangely enough, were the star performers on Britain's strangest dance hit this year so far. Deep Forest's 'Sweet Lullaby', constructed by two Belgians, combined the shiniest of ambient technology with samples of pygmies singing taken from an old Unesco CD. With the help of high powered remixing talent from top American producers like Masters At Work, it broke through the clubs, reaching number 8 in the charts." James Hamilton from Music Week's RM Dance Update described it as an "African chanted haunting Euro hit" and a "exotically atmospheric haunting ethereal drifter". Ian McCann from NME wrote, "What language is this? A chant, a Soul II Soul sort of beat, those appalling South American pan pipes that they have on TV nature programmes whenever they show mountains, and presumably, the intention to get a Future Sound Of London kinda hit. But the lullaby works. I'm...gradually...falling...to...zzz." James Hunter from Vibe deemed it "an eager pop confection of continental synths and excellent singing from "the rain forest pygmies of Africa"." Mike Joyce from The Washington Post complimented it as "a dreamy slice of Euro-pop dance music blended together with the haunting voices of a Pygmy chorus and an unidentified female from the Solomon Islands, who implores 'Don't cry, don't cry, your parents are never coming back.'" He added, "Her pinched, plaintive voice is set off by wooden flutelike synth sounds, a programmed drum track, Pygmies chanting in the Central African Baka dialect, and additional vocals. The result is a curious, video-friendly synthesis of ancient and contemporary cultures."

== Chart performance ==
"Sweet Lullaby" reached number three in Norway, number seven on the Australian ARIA Singles Chart, number 10 on the UK Singles Chart, number 78 on the US Billboard Top 100, and the top 20 in France, Iceland, Israel and Switzerland.

== Music video ==
The music video for "Sweet Lullaby" was directed by Indian director Tarsem Singh and filmed in eight countries, including Spain, China, Russia, Türkiye, India, Kenya and the US, during a four and a half week shoot in late 1993. The video follows the voyage of a young girl, portrayed by Tarsem's niece Shaan Sahota, who travels the world by tricycle in the quest to find sleep. Tarsem told in a 1994 interview with Billboard magazine about hearing the tune and noting the voice of a Pygmy girl singing a cappella at the close of the track, "I wanted to do the video just so I could use the girl singing this one line. It's just so brilliant." He worked on the video without pay and contributed his own funds to the production. "We would arrive at a location in the afternoon and spend about three hours taking polaroids in the city. At dinner, we would decide where to shoot. The next day, we would shoot, and the third day we would leave."

"Sweet Lullaby" was nominated for several awards at the 1994 MTV Video Music Awards as well as one nomination at the 1994 Music Video Production Awards in Los Angeles. Chuck Campbell of Knoxville News Sentinel commented on the video, "Early this year, the evocative video for 'Sweet Lullaby' floated into MTV's "Buzz Bin", which helped push the song into Billboard's Top 100 singles. Consequently, the album Deep Forest, now almost two years old, has been hitting top stride."

== Track listings ==
- 7-inch single
1. "Sweet Lullaby" – 3:54
2. "Forest Hymn" (edit) – 3:49
- 12-inch maxi
1. "Sweet Lullaby" (nature's dancing mix) – 5:58
2. "Sweet Lullaby" (remix) – 6:10
3. "Sweet Lullaby" (natural trance mix) – 6:32
4. "Sweet Lullaby" (ambient mix) – 3:46
- CD single
1. "Sweet Lullaby" (original mix)
2. "Sweet Lullaby" (ambient mix)
- CD maxi
1. "Sweet Lullaby" (original mix) – 3:55
2. "Sweet Lullaby" (remix) – 6:08
3. "Sweet Lullaby" (nature's dancing mix) – 6:01
4. "Sweet Lullaby" (natural trance mix) – 6:32
5. "Sweet Lullaby" (ambient mix) – 3:47
- 12-inch maxi – Remixes
1. "Sweet Lullaby" (round the world mix) – 6:58
2. "Sweet Lullaby" (DJ EFX's tribal as a mofo mix) – 4:40
3. "Sweet Lullaby" (the riot mix) – 6:51
4. "Sweet Lullaby" (digit's wet dream mix) – 4:25
5. "Sweet Lullaby" (Q-bass mix) – 5:57
6. "Sweet Lullaby" (the downstream mix) – 5:57
7. "Sweet Lullaby" (bonus a la EFX) – 3:08

== Charts ==
=== Weekly charts ===
Chart (1992–1994)	Peak position
Australia (ARIA)	7
Canada Dance/Urban (RPM)	9
Europe (Eurochart Hot 100)	38
France (SNEP)	17
Germany (GfK); 1992	31
Germany (GfK); 1994	96
Iceland (Íslenski Listinn Topp 40)	11
Ireland (IRMA)	11
Israel (Israeli Singles Chart)	15
Netherlands (Dutch Top 40)	8
Netherlands (Single Top 100)	10
New Zealand (Recorded Music NZ)	21
Norway (VG-lista)	4
Switzerland (Schweizer Hitparade)	15
UK Singles (Official Charts)	10
UK Airplay (Music Week)	32
UK Dance (Music Week)	3
UK Club Chart (Music Week)	47
US Billboard Hot 100	78
US Dance Club Play (Billboard)	6
US Maxi-Singles Sales (Billboard)	4
US Modern Rock Tracks (Billboard)	14
US Cash Box Top 100	57

=== Year-end charts ===
Chart (1993)	Position
Australia (ARIA)	90

Chart (1994)	Position
Netherlands (Dutch Top 40)	82
UK Singles (OCC)	120

== Certifications ==
Region	Certification	Certified units/sales
Australia (ARIA)	Gold	35,000^{^}
^{^} Shipments figures based on certification alone.

== Filmography ==
- The Voice from the Deep Forest (dir. Marit Lie, 2008) "UNESCO : Årsmelding 2008" (PDF). Sikt-fvdb-storage.s3.eu-north-1.amazonaws.com.
- Searching for Afunakwa: The Story Behind Deep Forest's "Sweet Lullaby" (dir. Matt Singmin, 2026)
- The Search for the Truth Behind Deep Forest's "Sweet Lullaby" (Australian Broadcasting Corporation, 2026)
