= Deep Forest (Deep Forest album) =

Studio album by Deep Forest
- Released: 1992
- Genre: World music; ambient; dance
- Length: 46:49
- Label: 550 Music
- Producer: Dan Lacksman, Guilain Joncheray

Deep Forest chronology
Deep Forest (1992)	World Mix (1994)

Singles from Deep Forest
- 1. "Deep Forest" Released: 1992; 2. "Sweet Lullaby" Released: 1992; 3. "White Whisper" Released: 1993; 4. "Forest Hymn" Released: 1993; 5. "Savana Dance" Released: 1994

Professional ratings
Review scores
Source	Rating
AllMusic	4/5 stars
Melody Maker	(favorable)
Music Week	4/5 stars
The Philadelphia Inquirer	3/4 stars
Select	1/5 medals

Deep Forest is the first studio album by the musical group Deep Forest, consisting of French duo Éric Mouquet and Michel Sanchez. The album mixes new age electronics with UNESCO field recordings of music from the Democratic Republic of the Congo, the Solomon Islands, Burundi, Tibesti, and the Sahel. Deep Forest was nominated for the Grammy Award for Best Global Music Album in 1994. For Sanchez and Mouquet, the most important purpose of the album was to express their fascination with the Efé people of the Democratic Republic of the Congo and to raise awareness of their quickly vanishing culture. As Mouquet noted, "It's not very often you can hear a Pygmy singing on the radio". Although some critics have argued that this purpose was never realised, for no Efé or Pygmy people featured on the album, samples of Pygmy music were in fact used on the record, albeit to a limited degree. The songs "Sweet Lullaby", "Hunting", and "Night Bird" feature three samples taken from the albums Cameroon: Baka Pygmy Music (1977) and Polyphony of Deep Rain Forest – The Music of the Pygmy in Ituri (1986, Ethnic Sound Series, vol. 4).

More than 3,5 million units of Deep Forest were sold worldwide. The album went gold in the US, UK, and France, and platinum in Australia. The songs "Sweet Lullaby", "Deep Forest", "Forest Hymn", and "Savana Dance" were released as singles, the first two of which became hits worldwide.

Deep Forest remains out of print, due to copyright and attribution disputes over the sampling of music from indigenous peoples. Though a percentage of the profits from sales of Deep Forest goes to the Pygmy Fund, a California-based organization committed to helping the natives of central Africa cope with environmental threats to their homeland, it has been noted that the indigenous groups featured on the album would not be assisted by the Pygmy Fund and that tax returns submitted by the fund did not show a significant increase in donations.

The songs "Night Bird" and "The First Twilight" are included on the 2005 album Joni Mitchell (Music That Matters To Her) by various artists.

In 1994, Deep Forest re-released the album under the title World Mix, which contains the same tracklist along with several new mixes.

== Track listing ==
All songs by Eric Mouquet and Michel Sanchez, except where indicated:

1. "Deep Forest" – 5:34
2. "Sweet Lullaby" – 3:53
3. "Hunting" – 3:27
4. "Night Bird" – 4:18
5. "The First Twilight" (Cooky Cue, Mouquet, Sanchez) – 3:18
6. "Savana Dance" (Cue, Mouquet, Sanchez) – 4:25
7. "Desert Walk" – 5:14
8. "White Whisper" – 5:45
9. "The Second Twilight" (Cue, Mouquet, Sanchez) – 1:24
10. "Sweet Lullaby (Ambient Mix)" – 3:41
11. "Forest Hymn" – 5:50 (Japanese bonus track)

== Personnel ==
- Eric Mouquet – arrangement, keyboards, programming
- Michel Sanchez – arrangement, keyboards, programming
- Cooky Cue – keyboards and programming on "Savana Dance"
- Michel Villain – vocals
- Dan Lacksman – producer

== Charts ==
=== Weekly charts ===
Chart (1992/93)	Peak position
Australian Albums (ARIA Charts)	4
UK	15
US Billboard 200	59

=== Year-end charts ===
Chart (1993)	Rank
Australian Albums (ARIA Charts)	18

== Certifications ==
Region	Certification	Certified units/sales
Australia (ARIA)	2× Platinum	140,000^{^}
France (SNEP)	Gold	100,000^{*}
United Kingdom (BPI)	Gold	100,000^{^}
United States (RIAA)	Gold	700,000
Summaries
Worldwide	—	3,500,000
^{*} Sales figures based on certification alone.^{^} Shipments figures based on certification alone.
