= Michel Sanchez (musician) =

French musician (born 1957)

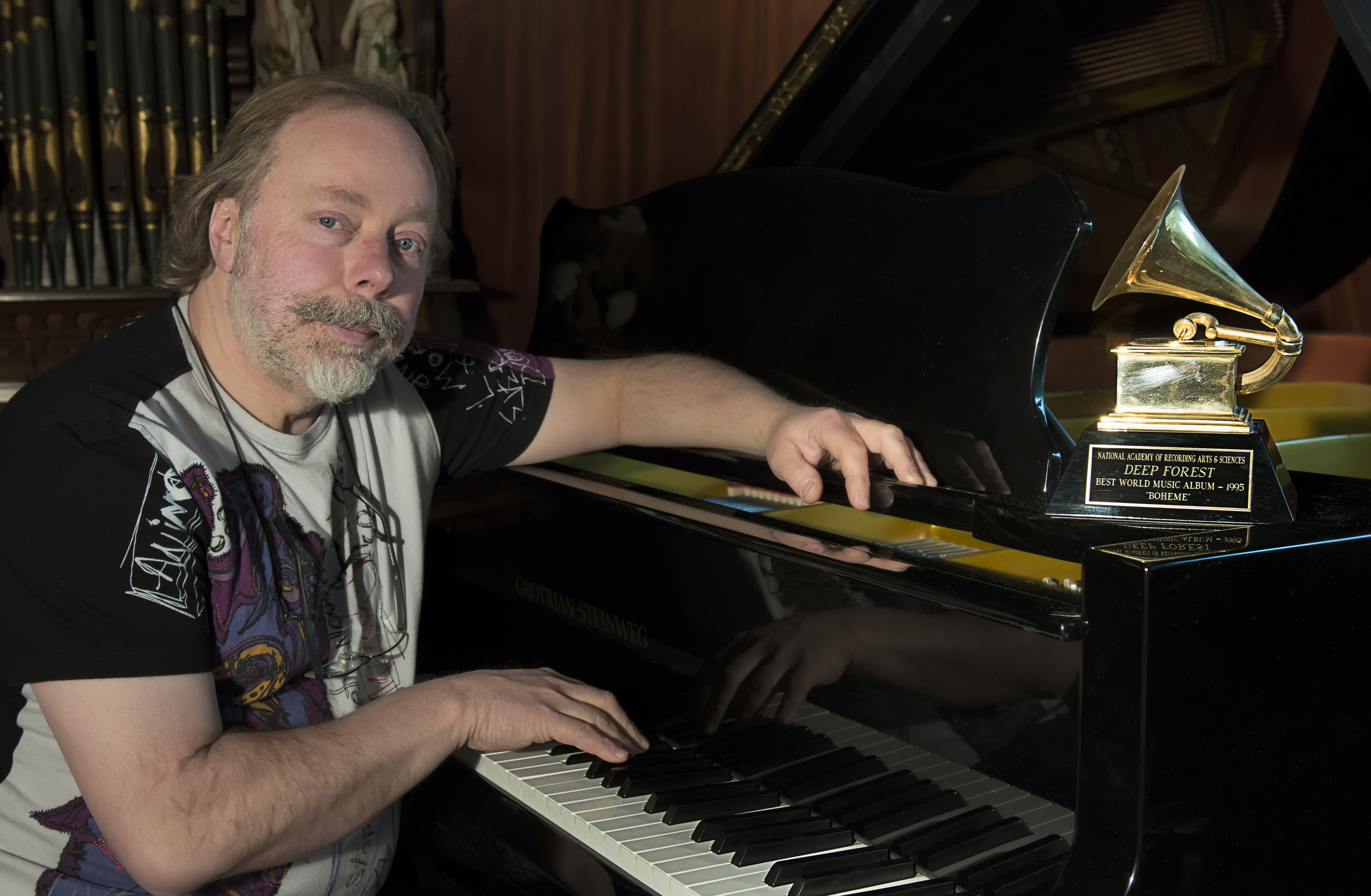
- Sanchez in 2013

Background information
- Born: 1 July 1957 (age 68); Somain, France
- Genres: World music
- Occupations: Musician; composer
- Instruments: Keyboards; piano; organ; accordion
- Years active: 1992–present
- Formerly of: Deep Forest

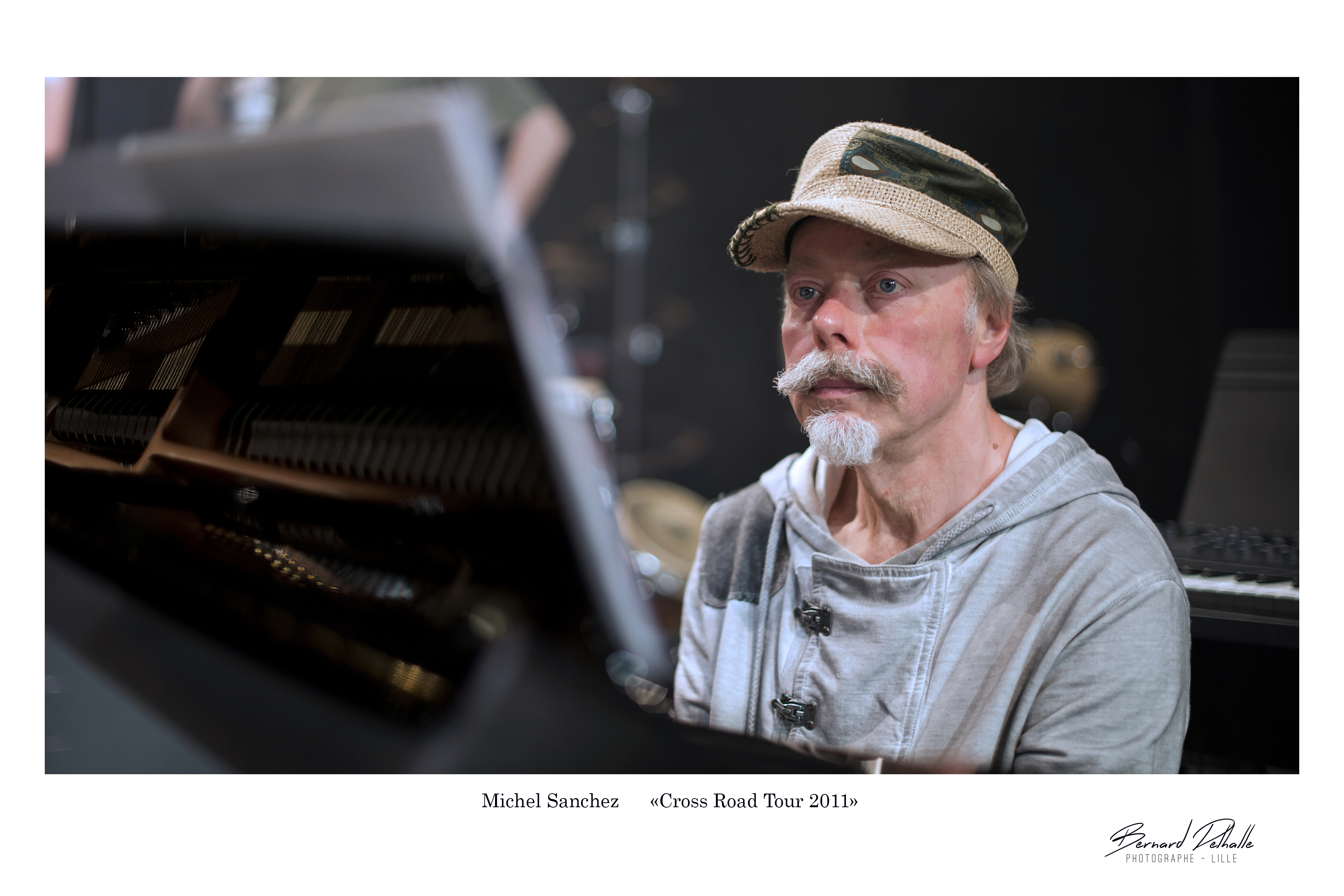
Michel Sanchez during his 2011 Cross Road Tour

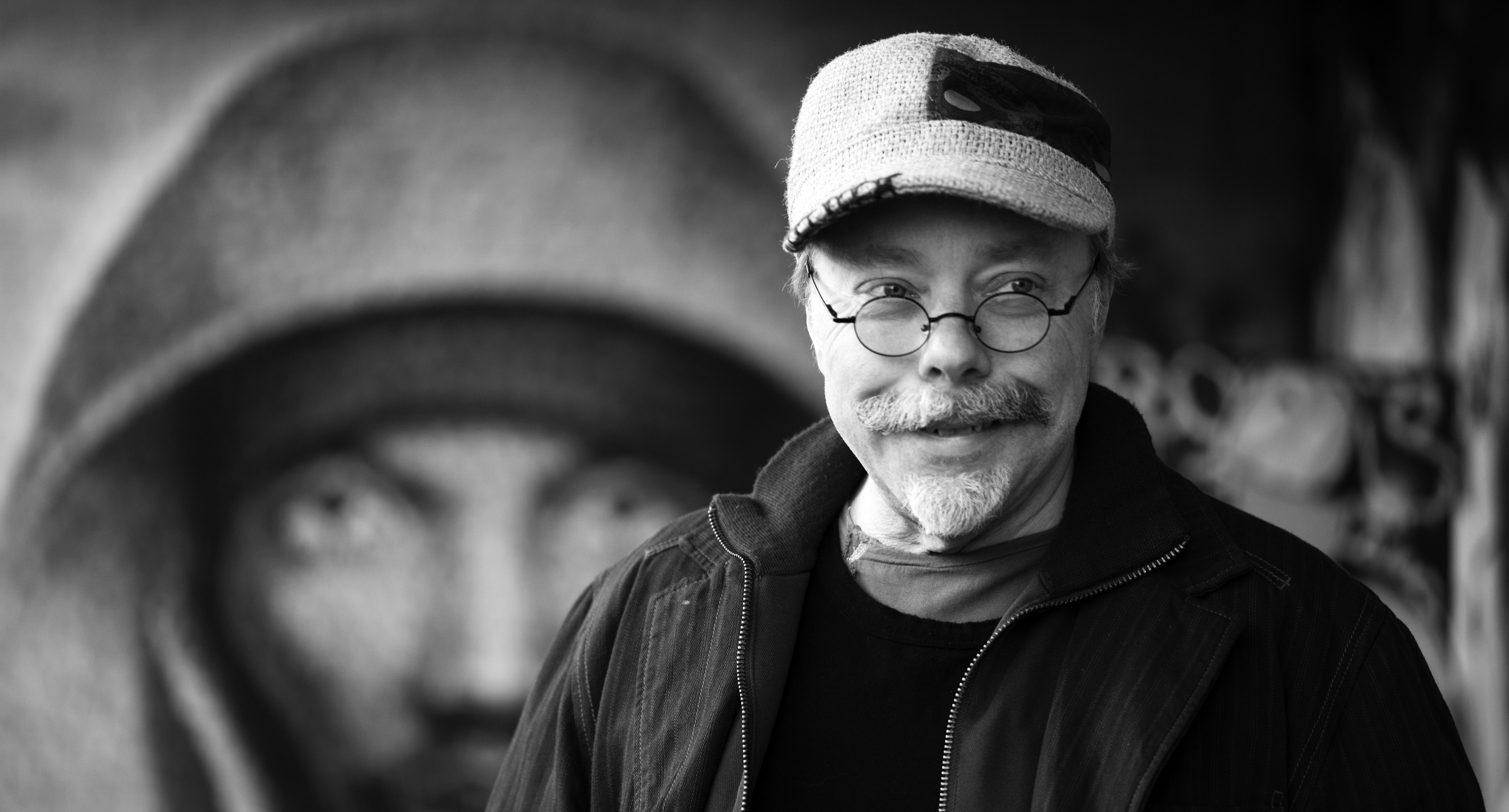
Michel Sanchez in 2013

Michel Sanchez (born 1 July 1957) is a French musician. He studied piano and classical organ percussion in his youth, and in 1992, he co-founded the world music project Deep Forest with Éric Mouquet, which won two Grammy Awards during that decade.

Sanchez left Deep Forest in 2005 to focus on his solo career, which he had launched in 1994 with the album Windows. He has since released eight further albums, including Welenga in 1997, with Wes Madiko.

== Discography ==
=== with Deep Forest ===
- Deep Forest (1992)
- World Mix (1994 re-release of 1992 album)
- Boheme (1995)
- Comparsa (1998)
- Made in Japan (live, 1999)
- Pacifique (soundtrack, 2000)
- Music Detected (2002)
- Essence of Deep Forest (Japanese compilation, 2003)
- Essence of the Forest (compilation, 2004)
- Kusa no Ran (soundtrack, 2004)

=== Solo ===
- Windows (1994)
- Welenga with Wes Madiko (1997)
- Hieroglyphes (2000)
- The Touch (2008)
- The Day of a Paper Bird (2008)
- Eliott (2014)
- The Man and the Machine (2015)
- Ca Sent L'Jazz (2016)
- Windows II (2016)
