= Deep Forest =

French electronic music project

Background information
- Origin: France
- Genres: Electronic; new-age; ambient; world; ethnic electronica
- Years active: 1992–present
- Members: Éric Mouquet
- Past members: Michel Sanchez
- Website: deep-forest.fr

Deep Forest is a French music project that originally began as a duo consisting of Michel Sanchez and Éric Mouquet, who created a style of world music, sometimes called ethnic electronica, mixing ethnic with electronic sounds and dance or chillout beats. Deep Forest's sound has been described as an "ethno-introspective ambient world music".

The project's self-titled debut album was nominated in 1994 for the Best World Music Album Grammy, and in 1996, they won the same award for Boheme. Deep Forest's albums have sold over ten million copies. Sanchez left the project in 2005 to focus on a solo career, while Mouquet has continued working under the band's original name. As of 2025, the project has released 13 studio albums as well as a number of live records and several soundtracks and compilations.

== History ==
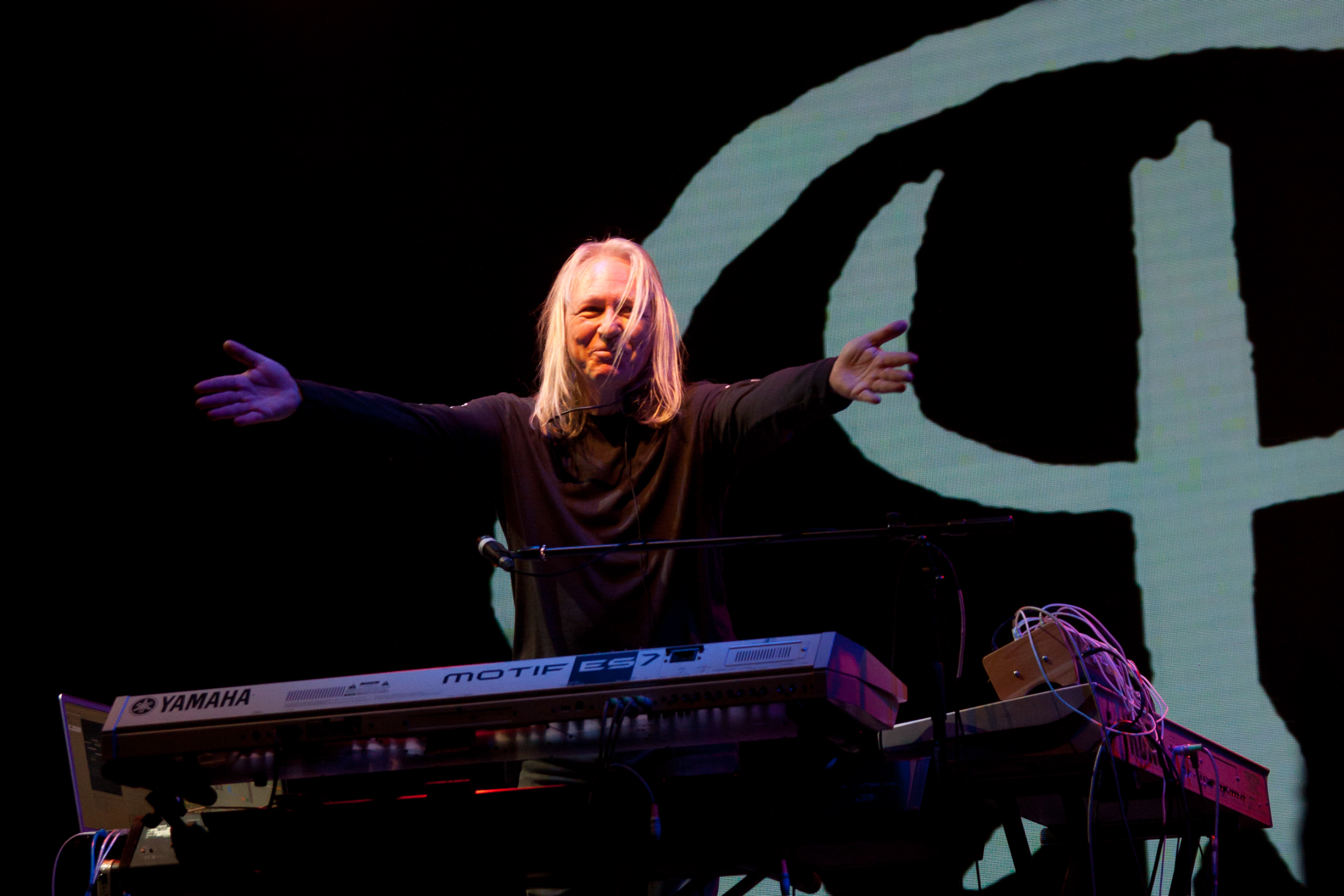
Éric Mouquet, co-founder of Deep Forest, performing in 2017

In 1992, French musician Michel Sanchez came up with the idea of combining Baka-language spoken words with modern music after hearing onsite recordings of the tribespeople conversing. Along with his compatriot Eric Mouquet, he created the project Deep Forest. According to Mouquet, the name stems from a combination of Deep Purple and "rainforest".

The group's debut, self-titled album was released in 1992, with the single "Sweet Lullaby" reaching the UK Top 10 chart. The track is an adaptation of a traditional song from the Solomon Islands. The album was dance-driven, and the samples were heavily digitised and edited. It was nominated for the Best World Music Album Grammy in 1994 and re-released as a limited edition the same year, under the name World Mix.

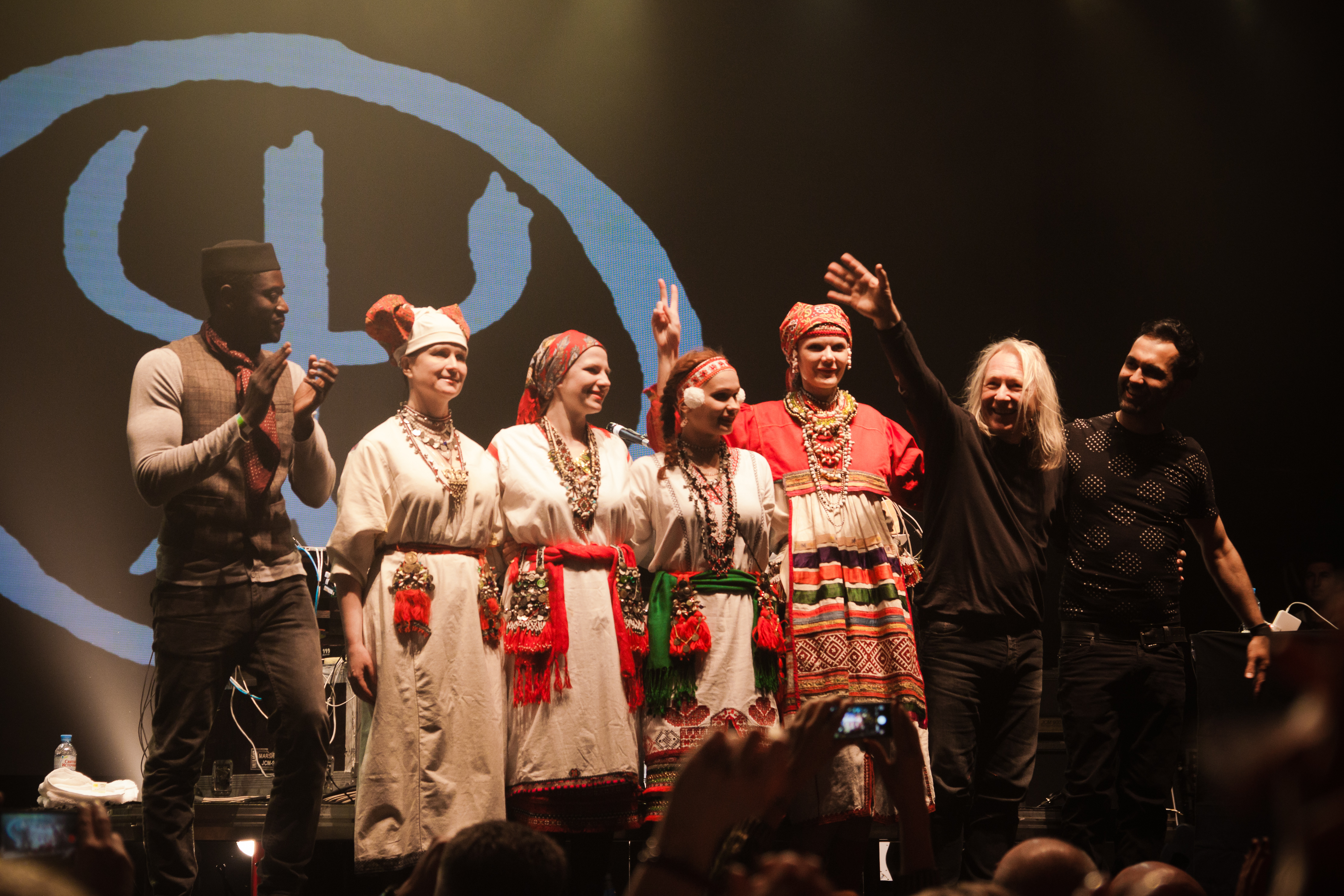
Deep Forest onstage with the Russian folk group Oyme after a 2017 concert

On their second album, Boheme (1995), Sanchez and Mouquet ventured into Eastern Europe, sampling Hungarian and Romani music, with input from Hungarian singer Márta Sebestyén and the Bulgarian Kate Petrova. The record also includes the track "While the Earth Sleeps", a collaboration with Peter Gabriel that was included on the soundtrack to the film Strange Days, to which Deep Forest also contributed the song "Coral Lounge".

The project's third album, Comparsa (1997), pivots toward Latin American music, with the title referencing carnival comparsas. It includes contributions from Abed Azrie, Ana Torroja, Joe Zawinul, and Jorge Reyes.

In 1999, Deep Forest released their first live album, titled Made in Japan. That year, the duo worked with Algerian singer Cheb Mami and French musician Catherine Lara on the song "L'Enfant Fleur", which was included on the Sol En Si charity album Solidarité Enfants Sida.

Music Detected was the title of their next album, released in 2002, and it included collaborations with Indonesian-French singer Anggun, American singer-songwriter Beverly Jo Scott, Japanese singer Chitose Hajime, and British singer-songwriter Angela McCluskey.

In 2003, the duo released their first compilation album, titled Essence of Deep Forest, which saw publication only in Japan and was reissued internationally as Essence of the Forest a year later, with a different tracklist. Also in 2003, Deep Forest appeared on the track "Never Let Go" from Josh Groban's album Closer, which also included a writing and production credit by Mouquet on "Remember When It Rained". Mouquet worked with Groban once more on the latter's next album, Awake, on the track "Machine". In 2005, Sanchez left Deep Forest to focus on a solo career, which he had launched in 1994 with the album Windows.

The next Deep Forest studio album, titled Deep Brasil, saw Mouquet spearheading the project alone for the first time. Deep India, an album-length collaboration with Indian musician Rahul Sharma, came out in 2013, and the same year, Deep Forest released Deep Africa, with Mouquet's own name added to the title. The album included contributions from African musicians Lokua Kanza, Blick Bassy, Wasis Diop, Olyza Zamati, and Danny de Mouataba. In 2017, Mouquet contributed to the track "Vsesvit" from the Ukrainian electro-folk band Onuka's second album, Mozaїka.

In 2015, Deep Forest issued the album Evo Devo, and in 2018, the project worked with Anglo-Italian musician Gaudi on Epic Circuits. This was followed in 2020 by Deep Symphonic, an orchestral reimagining of nine previously released songs. Eponymous, a re-recording of Deep Forest, came out in 2021, and Burning was issued in 2023. The project's latest release is Crystal Clear, a 2024 collaboration with Olivier Delevingne.

== Music for film ==
In 1994, Deep Forest contributed the song "Martha" to the soundtrack for Robert Altman's Prêt-à-Porter. A year later, the duo was hired to provide a full original score for the movie Strange Days, after Michael Kamen had left the project, and their credit appears on early advertising for the film. In the end, the project was taken over by Graeme Revell. Deep Forest contributed two tracks to the soundtrack, however: "Coral Lounge" and "While the Earth Sleeps", a collaboration with Peter Gabriel that was later included on their second album, Boheme.

In 2000, Deep Forest composed the soundtrack to the French film Le Prince du Pacifique, titled Pacifique. In 2004, they wrote music for the Japanese film Kusa No Ran. A year later, a version of "Sweet Lullaby" titled "Sweet Lullaby Dancing Remix" began to be used in Matt Harding's viral hit "Where the Hell is Matt?"

== Charity ==
A percentage of proceeds from sales of Deep Forest's debut album went to the Pygmy Fund, set up to aid the DRC's Efé people in the transition from nomadic to agrarian subsistence and to provide appropriate health care. However, music of the Efé people was not included on the record. A portion of the proceeds from Boheme went to the György Martin Foundation, which aids in protecting the Roma culture of Hungary. Deep Forest has also supported the Sana Madagascar Association, whose goal is to help the Malagasy protect their environment and save their traditional cultures.

== Controversy ==
"Sweet Lullaby"

Deep Forest's signature song "Sweet Lullaby" centres on an uncredited recording of the ancestral Baegu lullaby "Rorogwela", from Malaita, sung by a woman named Afunakwa and recorded by the ethnomusicologist Hugo Zemp. The recording was used without authorization from Afunakwa, Zemp, the label UNESCO Discs, or the distributor Auvidis—although Zemp had earlier given verbal permission for an unrelated recording to be used. The case has since become a cause célèbre as an example of primitivist caricature and cultural appropriation.

In 2026, the filmmakers Matt Singman and Jonathan Jenkins released the documentary Searching for Afunakwa, which traces the story behind "Sweet Lullaby", as they travelled to the Solomon Islands to meet the Baegu people who knew Afunakwa (who died in the 1990s). The film also introduces the Afunakwa Foundation, a charity set up to support the community. Its trustees include three of Afunakwa's grandsons.

"Freedom Cry"

"Freedom Cry", from Deep Forest's 1995 album, Boheme, caused controversy when it was revealed that the Roma singer Károly Rostás ("Huttyán") never received any monetary compensation, and neither did his family after he died in 1986, though his singing, archived by Claude Flagel, was sampled on the track. Flagel allegedly paid Rostás 1,500 Ft (about US$30 in 1986) for the recording. The case was later documented in a movie titled Huttyán, released in 1996. Rostás's relatives did eventually succeed in obtaining some money from Deep Forest.

== Awards and recognition ==
- 1993 Victoires de la Musique for World Music Album – Deep Forest: nominated
- 1994 Grammy Award for Best Global Music Album – Deep Forest: nominated
- 1994 MTV Video Music Awards for MTV Video Music Award – Breakthrough Video – "Sweet Lullaby": nominated
- 1994 MTV Video Music Awards for MTV Video Music Award for Best Direction – "Sweet Lullaby": nominated
- 1994 MTV Video Music Awards for MTV Video Music Award for Best Editing – "Sweet Lullaby": nominated
- 1994 MTV Video Music Awards for MTV Video Music Award for Best Cinematography – "Sweet Lullaby": nominated
- 1996 Grammy Award for Best Global Music Album – Boheme: won
- 1996 Victoires de la Musique for Newcomer Group: nominated

== Discography ==
=== Albums ===
Studio albums

- 1992: Deep Forest (reissued as World Mix in 1994)
- 1995: Boheme
- 1997: Comparsa
- 2002: Music Detected
- 2008: Deep Brasil
- 2013: Deep India (with Rahul Sharma)
- 2013: Deep Africa
- 2015: Evo Devo
- 2018: Epic Circuits (with Gaudi)
- 2020: Deep Symphonic
- 2021: Eponymous (a re-recording of Deep Forest)
- 2023: Burning
- 2024: Crystal Clear (with Olivier Delevingne)
- 2025: Tree of Tranquility (with Rahul Sharma)
- 2026: SOUL

Live albums

- 1999: Made in Japan
- 2025: Live Machine

Soundtracks

- 2000: Pacifique
- 2004: Kusa no Ran (released only in Japan)

Compilations

- 2003: Essence of Deep Forest (released only in Japan)
- 2004: Essence of the Forest

=== Singles ===
- 1992 – "Deep Forest" (UK No. 20) Australia No. 32
- 1992 – "Sweet Lullaby"
- 1992 – "White Whisper"
- 1993 – "Forest Hymn"
- 1994 – "Savana Dance"
- 1994 – "Undecided" (with Youssou N'dour)
- 1995 – "Boheme"
- 1995 – "Marta's Song" (with Márta Sebestyén)
- 1996 – "While the Earth Sleeps" (with Peter Gabriel)
- 1996 – "Bohemian Ballet"
- 1997 – "Freedom Cry"
- 1997 – "Madazulu"
- 1998 – "Media Luna"
- 1998 – "Noonday Sun"
- 1999 – "Hunting" (live)
- 1999 – "Sweet Lullaby" (live)
- 2000 – "Pacifique"
- 2002 – "Deep Blue Sea" (with Anggun)
- 2002 – "Endangered Species"
- 2002 – "Will You Be Ready"

=== Contributions ===
- 2000: Catherine Lara – Aral
- 2003: Josh Groban – Closer
- 2006: Josh Groban – Awake
- 2012: The Syndicate – File Under Zawinul

== See also ==
- List of ambient music artists
