= Claude Flagel =

French musician (1932–2020)

- Born: 1 July 1932; Paris, France
- Died: 25 February 2020 (aged 87); Brussels, Belgium
- Occupation: Musician

Claude Flagel (1 July 1932 – 25 February 2020) was a French contemporary musician. He produced music for Mamady Keïta, Ibrahima Sarr, Foofango, Mint Aichata, Tartit, and Momo Wandel Soumah.

Flagel lived in Brussels from 1954 until his death on 25 February 2020, at the age of 87.

== Discography ==
- 11 Lieder (1964)
- La Vielle (1973)
- Maclotes, Passepîds Et Autres Danses de Wallonie (1976)
- L'Orchésographie De Thoinot Arbeau (1977)
- La Belle Vielleuse (1979)
- Tant Crie L'on Noël (1979)
- Oeuvres Symphoniques (1999)
