= Rather Be Alone =

Single by Robin Schulz, Nick Martin and Sam Martin

from the album IIII
- Released: 13 September 2019
- Genre: Disco house
- Length: 2:51
- Label: Warner Germany
- Songwriters: Daniel Deimann; Dennis Bierbrodt; Guido Kramer; Isidoros Kiloudis; Jason Evigan; Jordan Johnson; Jürgen Dohr; Marcus Lomax; Nikolaos Martinos; Robin Schulz; Sam Martin; Sean Douglas; Stefan Dabruck; Stefan Johnson; Lennie King'ori; Jhawgez Von Rubixx; Spax Di Genius
- Producers: Junkx; Nick Martin; Robin Schulz; The Monsters and the Strangerz

Robin Schulz singles chronology
"All This Love" (2019)	"Rather Be Alone" (2019)	"In Your Eyes" (2020)

Sam Martin singles chronology
"High and Low" (2019)	"Rather Be Alone" (2019)	"Miles Away" (2019)

Music video
- "Rather Be Alone" on YouTube

"Rather Be Alone" is a song by German DJ Robin Schulz, Greek DJ Nick Martin and American singer Sam Martin. It was released on 13 September 2019 through Warner Germany. The production assistants consist of German band Junkx and American band the Monsters and the Strangerz.

== Background ==
Robin Schulz and Nick Martin already worked together for several projects. First, it was in 2017, when Nick Martin remixed Robin Schulz song "I Believe I'm Fine". The Greek DJ and producer has too performed on Robin & Friends' Tomorrowland stage in 2019. A few days before the release, Robin Schulz used social networks to make hints about this song. On 11 September, he posted the following message : "coming soon... #chapter2", in reference to this track and to the first chapter which designs his previous single, "All This Love" which was released in May 2019. One day before, he indicated that this second chapter will come on 13 September.

== Critical reception ==
The song evokes, through Sam Martin’s vocals, a non-reciprocal love that a man has for the woman of his dreams. According to Philipp Kressmann from Westdeutscher Rundfunk, "Rather Be Alone" is heading for the disco and has some brass vibes. He added that the combo "sounds much poppier than [Robin Schulz's] last tracks and reminds of cheerful tunes of Alle Farben or Felix Jaehn". German magazine Klatsch Tratsch noted that it has disco influences, with a new side, by the presence of "a whipping groove with funky brass, housy piano vibes and a vocal voice of Sam Martin". His vocals were also compared to the British-Australian pop-rock group The Bee Gees in their heyday. Similarly, Przemysław Kokot of Polish music portal Wyspa made this comparison. He noted the presence of disco sounds in the number, with "a pulsating groove with funky trumpets, heavy piano sound and Sam Martin's vocal". Hungarian website Zene called the song dizzying and also remarked a fusion between dance-pop elements and disco sensation of the 70s-80s.

== Music video ==
At the same day of the release, Robin Schulz posted an official lyric video of the single. Then, the official music video of the song was released on 7 October through his YouTube channel, featuring German model Toni Garrn and Scottish band The Electrics. The clip is the continuation of the story which started in "All This Love", the first chapter. It shows the DJ becoming an avatar in a computer simulation and meeting the avatar of the German model. Together they compete against computer opponents in a dance competition. In order to promote Toni Garrn's presence, Robin Schulz said via Instagram, "Proud to announce that @tonigarrn wants to be starring in my new music video !" She commented his post, by leading the following message: "Can not wait to see." The collaboration between the two people was explained by the DJ. He has been looking for a suitable casting for a long time with his producer who asked the model to appear for another project. Schulz thought it might be a good idea, and that’s how their collaboration came about. They met at the shoot and Robin Schulz, according to him, immediately understood with her.

Schulz confessed to German newspaper Hamburger Morgenpost that he wanted to create something original, at least in Germany. During the shooting of the video, his body was photographed by hundred cameras, scanned 360 degrees, in order to shoot every corner. He had orders not to move, and as a result, he considered that it was quite long but rather funny. The DJ described Toni Garrn as "highly professional", with "a very pleasant personality" and noted that she "fits in the story perfectly."

The video also marks the world's first music video that was entirely produced by the games engine Unreal. It was produced in cooperation by A Current State, a company of star photographer and director Robert Wunsch, with Mimic Productions whose founder once developed the Face Motion Capturing for the movie hit "Avatar".

== Track listing ==
Digital download
No.	Title	Length
1.	"Rather Be Alone"	2:51
2.	"All This Love" (featuring Harlœ)	2:44
3.	"Speechless" (featuring Erika Sirola)	3:34

Digital download – Madison Mars Remix
No.	Title	Length
1.	"Rather Be Alone" (Madison Mars Remix)	2:54

Digital download – Redondo Remix
No.	Title	Length
1.	"Rather Be Alone" (Redondo Remix)	2:52

== Credits and personnel ==
Credits adapted from Tidal.

- Robin Schulz – production, composition, lyrics, keyboards, programming
- Nick Martin – production, composition, lyrics, keyboards
- Sam Martin – composition, lyrics, vocals
- Daniel Deimann – composition, lyrics, keyboards, programming
- Dennis Bierbrodt – production, composition, lyrics, keyboards, programming, engineering, mixing
- Guido Kramer – production, composition, lyrics, keyboards, programming, engineering, mixing
- Isidoros Kiloudis – composition, lyrics, keyboards, programming
- Jason Evigan – composition, lyrics
- Jordan Johnson – composition, lyrics, production
- Jürgen Dohr – production, composition, lyrics, programming, engineering, mixing
- Marcus Lomax – composition, lyrics, production
- Sean Douglas – composition, lyrics
- Stefan Dabruck – composition, lyrics
- Stefan Johnson – composition, lyrics, production
- Shane Kairu – composition, lyrics
- Lennie King'ori – composition, lyrics
- Jhawgez Von Rubixx – composition, lyrics
- Spax Di Genius – composition, lyrics
- Alexander Izquierdo – production
- Clarence Coffee Jr – production

== Charts ==
Chart (2019)	Peak position
Belgium Dance (Ultratop Flanders)	37
Croatia Airplay (HRT)	80
