= IIII =

IIII may refer to:

Counting rods vertical representation of -4

- IIII (album), by Robin Schulz, 2021
- IIII, a representation of 4 in Roman numerals, as seen on clock faces
- IIII vertical form of 4 (red) or -4 (black) in counting rods
