= All We Got (Robin Schulz song) =

Single by Robin Schulz featuring Kiddo

from the album IIII
- Released: 16 October 2020
- Length: 3:10
- Label: Warner Music
- Songwriters: Alessandra Günthardt; Daniel Deimann; Fredrik Samsson; Guido Kramer; Jürgen Dohr; Oliver Lundström; Robin Schulz; Stefan Dabruck; Kiddo
- Producers: Junkx; Robin Schulz

Robin Schulz singles chronology
"Alane" (2020)	"All We Got" (2020)	"One More Time" (2021)

"All We Got" is a song by German DJ and record producer Robin Schulz, featuring vocals from Swedish singer-songwriter Kiddo. The song was released on 16 October 2020 as the sixth single from his fourth studio album IIII (2021). The song was written by Alessandra Günthardt, Daniel Deimann, Fredrik Samsson, Guido Kramer, Jürgen Dohr, Oliver Lundström, Robin Schulz, Stefan Dabruck and Kiddo.

== Music video ==
The official music video of the song was released on 16 October 2020 through Robin Schulz's YouTube account. The music video was directed by Maxim Rosenbauer and Moritz Ross. It was filmed in Bucharest, Romania, and stars athletes Andrada Craciun and Olivia Cîmpian as rival gymnasts.

== Track listing ==
Digital download and stream
No.	Title	Length
1.	"All We Got" (featuring Kiddo)	3:10

Digital download – Ofenbach remix
No.	Title	Length
1.	"All We Got" (featuring Kiddo; Ofenbach remix)	2:09

Digital download – Joel Corry remix
No.	Title	Length
1.	"All We Got" (featuring Kiddo; Joel Corry remix)	2:40

Digital download – Dario Rodriguez remix
No.	Title	Length
1.	"All We Got" (featuring Kiddo; Dario Rodriguez remix)	2:51

== Personnel ==
Credits adapted from Tidal.

- Junkx – producers, engineers, keyboards, mixers, programming
- Robin Schulz – producer, composer, lyricist, keyboards, programming
- Alessandra Günthardt – composer, lyricist
- Daniel Deimann – composer, lyricist
- Dennis Bierbrodt – composer
- Fredrik Samsson – composer, lyricist
- Guido Kramer – composer, lyricist
- Jürgen Dohr – composer, lyricist
- Oliver Lundström – composer, lyricist
- Stefan Dabruck – composer, lyricist
- Kiddo – composer, lyricist, featured artist, vocals
- Michael Schwabe – masterer

== Charts ==
=== Weekly charts ===
Weekly chart performance for "All We Got"
Chart (2020–2021)	Peak position
Austria (Ö3 Austria Top 40)	4
Belgium (Ultratop 50 Flanders)	12
Belgium (Ultratop 50 Wallonia)	10
Czech Republic Airplay (ČNS IFPI)	1
Czech Republic Singles Digital (ČNS IFPI)	6
France (SNEP)	19
Germany (GfK)	5
Germany Airplay (BVMI)	1
Global 200 (Billboard)	130
Hungary (Rádiós Top 40)	13
Italy (FIMI)	46
Mexico Ingles Airplay (Billboard)	22
Netherlands (Dutch Top 40)	4
Netherlands (Single Top 100)	5
Norway (VG-lista)	16
Poland (Polish Airplay Top 100)	1
Romania (Airplay 100)	10
San Marino (SMRRTV Top 50)	38
Slovakia Airplay (ČNS IFPI)	1
Slovakia (Singles Digitál Top 100)	6
Sweden (Sverigetopplistan)	90
Switzerland (Schweizer Hitparade)	4
US Hot Dance/Electronic Songs (Billboard)	20

=== Year-end charts ===
Year-end chart performance for "All We Got"
Chart (2021)	Position
Austria (Ö3 Austria Top 40)	35
Belgium (Ultratop Flanders)	44
Belgium (Ultratop Wallonia)	35
France (SNEP)	103
Germany (Official German Charts)	29
Hungary (Rádiós Top 40)	36
Netherlands (Dutch Top 40)	4
Netherlands (Single Top 100)	40
Poland (ZPAV)	28
Switzerland (Schweizer Hitparade)	30
US Hot Dance/Electronic Songs (Billboard)	92

== Certifications ==
Certifications for "All We Got"
Region	Certification	Certified units/sales
Austria (IFPI Austria)	Platinum	30,000^{‡}
Belgium (BRMA)	Gold	20,000^{‡}
Canada (Music Canada)	Gold	40,000^{‡}
France (SNEP)	Diamond	333,333^{‡}
Germany (BVMI)	Platinum	400,000^{‡}
Italy (FIMI)	Platinum	70,000^{‡}
Poland (ZPAV)	Platinum	50,000^{‡}
^{‡} Sales+streaming figures based on certification alone.
