= Erik Smaaland =

Music producer

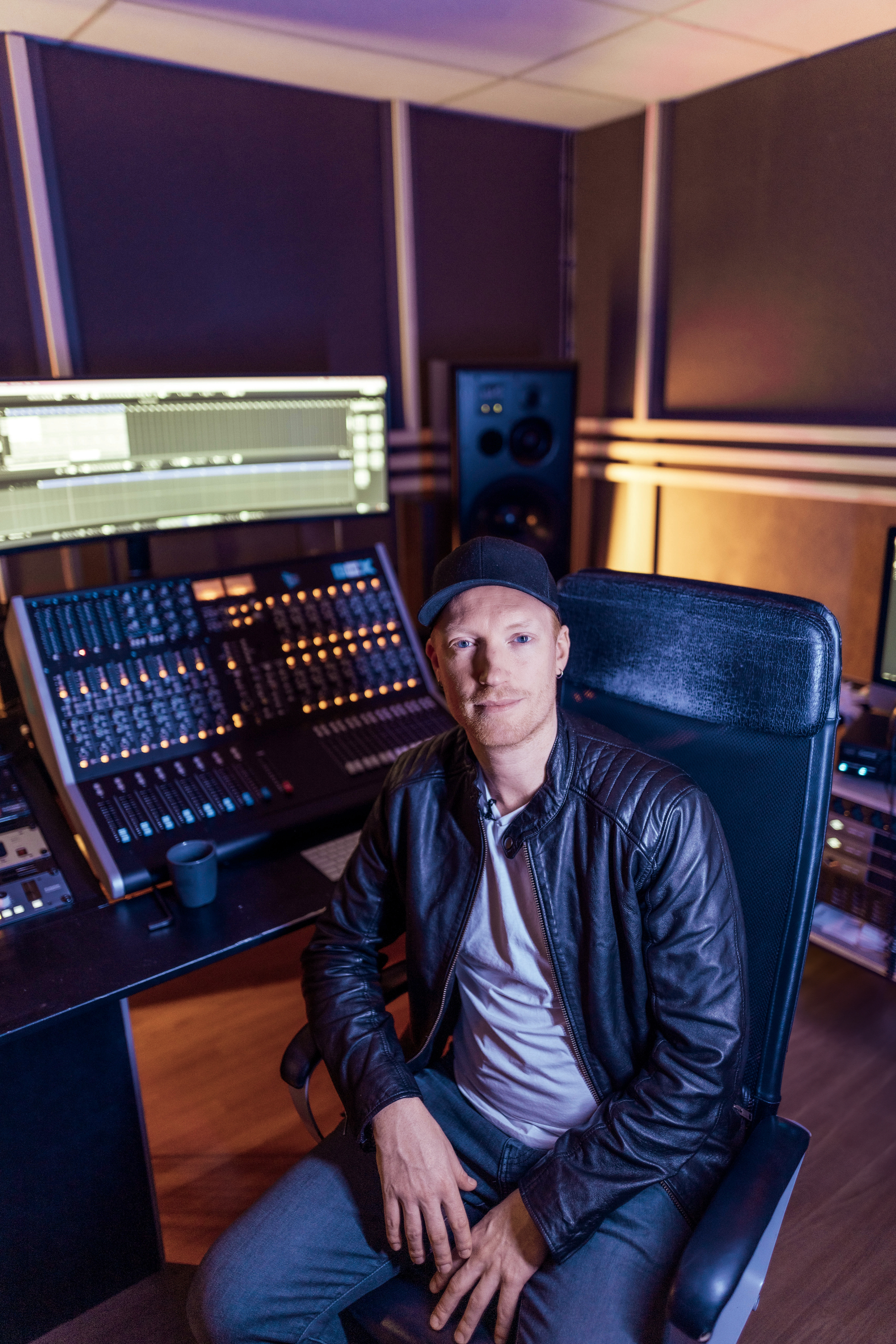
- Erik Smaaland

Background information
- Also known as: Smaaland, K&S, GoToGuy
- Born: Erik Gustaf Smaaland; May 2, 1986 (age 40); Bærum
- Genres: Dance, pop, EDM
- Occupations: Producer, songwriter, musical director, guitarist

Erik Smaaland is a Norwegian music producer and songwriter who has worked internationally. Smaaland has been involved in writing and producing singles such as "Lay Low" for Tiësto, and has worked with artists including Rita Ora, Jess Glynne, Jonas Blue, R3HAB, Tiago PZK, IVE, Dillon Francis, Lukas Graham, and Armin Van Buuren. In 2024, Smaaland was awarded "International Success of the Year" at the Norwegian Spellemann Awards.

Smaaland's international breakthrough came with the hit "Alone, Pt. II" by Alan Walker and Ava Max, which charted in the Top 20 in seven countries and reached #77 on Spotify's global charts. Around the same time, Robin Schulz's "In Your Eyes" featuring Alida reached #3 on the German Airplay charts and topped Billboard's Dance chart.

In early 2020, Smaaland attained three #1 singles in Norway and worked on projects such as "One More Dance" with R3HAB. In 2021, he co-wrote and produced tracks like "One More Time" by Robin Schulz and Felix Jaehn, "Love Again" by Alok and VIZE, "Weight Of The World" by Armin Van Buuren, and "Scandal" from TWICE's Taste of Love EP. He has since then had four Top 3 singles on the official German Airplay Chart.

Domestically, Smaaland gained recognition in 2017 with Hkeem's "Fy Faen," which topped the charts in Norway and entered the Top 20 in Sweden. He has since produced an array of Top 20 charters for local Norwegian acts.

He won "Song of the Year" at the 2017 Spellemann Awards and was nominated for "Best Breakthrough Songwriter" at the Norwegian Publishers Awards. In 2020, he received four Spellemann nominations, including three for "Song of the Year".

Selected discography
Year	Title	Artist	Album	Credited
2019	Alone, Pt. II	Alan Walker & Ava Max	World of Walker	producer and co-writer
2020	One More Dance	R3HAB x Alida	Non-album single	producer and co-writer
2020	In Your Eyes (feat. Alida)	Robin Schulz	1st single of album IIII	co-writer
2021	Love Again	Alok & Vize	Non-album single	producer and co-writer
2021	One More Time (feat. Alida)	Robin Schulz & Felix Jaehn	3rd single of album IIII	producer and co-writer
2021	Weight Of The World	Armin Van Buuren & RBVLN	Non-album single	producer and co-writer
2021	Scandal	TWICE	Taste Of Love (EP)	producer and co-writer
2021	Another Level	Timmy Trumpet	Non-album single	producer and co-writer
2021	The Portrait (Oh La La)	R3HAB & Gabry Ponte	Non-album single	co-writer
2021	Real Love	Dillon Francis & Aleyna Tilki	Lead single of album Happy Machine	producer and co-writer
2021	Swimming In Your Eyes	Dynoro	Non-album single	co-producer and co-writer
2021	Most People	R3HAB & Lukas Graham	Non-album single	co-producer and co-writer
2021	Close Your Eyes	Kshmr & Tungevaag	Non-album single	co-writer
2021	Out Of Love	Alan Walker & Au/Ra	World of Walker	co-writer
2021	Over You (feat. Lovespeake)	Kshmr	Non-album single	co-writer and producer
2022	Headlights	Alok, Alan Walker feat Kiddo	Non-album single	co-producer and co-writer
2022	In My Dreams	Red Velvet (group)	The ReVe Festival 2022 – Feel My Rhythm	co-producer and co-writer
2022	Perfect Melody	Jonas Blue, Julian Perretta	Non-album single	co-producer and co-writer
2023	Lay Low	Tiesto	Single from Drive	co-writer
2023	Forget You (with Gabry Ponte)	Lumix (DJ), ALIDA, Gabry Ponte	Non-album single	co-producer and co-writer
2023	Body Talk	Ofenbach, SVEA	Non-album single	producer and co-writer
2023	Shine With Me	IVE	I've IVE	producer and co-writer
2023	Rock My Body	R3HAB, INNA, Sash!	Non-album single	producer and co-writer
2023	Bad Blood	Nana, Sangah, Suyun, Yeeun, Wooyeon, Kei	Queendom Puzzle All-Rounder Battle 2	co-producer and co-writer
2023	Bad Reputation	Jini	An Iron Hand In A Velvet Glove	co-writer
2023	I'll Be There	Robin Schulz, Rita Ora, Tiago PZK	Non-album single	co-producer and co-writer
2023	Revolution	Alle Farben	Non-album single	co-writer and co-producer
2024	Summer's Back	ALOK, Jess Glynne	Non-album single	co-producer and co-writer
2025	Diamond Heart	Bennett, Timmy Trumpet	Non-album single	co-producer and co-writer
