= Winona Oak =

Swedish singer-songwriter (born 1994)

- Born: Johanna Winona Ekmark; 8 October 1994 (age 32); Falun, Sweden
- Occupation: Singer-songwriter
- Years active: 2018–present
- Spouse: Guy Berryman (m. 2026)
- Musical career
- Genres: Electropop; dance-pop
- Instruments: Vocals
- Labels: Neon Gold; Atlantic; Disruptor; Columbia

Johanna Winona Ekmark (born 8 October 1994), also known as Winona Oak and sometimes as Oaks, is a Swedish singer-songwriter. In 2018, she became known for her cover of the Haim song "Don't Save Me" and collaborative singles like "Beautiful" (with What So Not) and "Hope" (with The Chainsmokers).

== Early life ==
Oak was born in Umeå but grew up on Sollerön, an island in Lake Siljan in the central-southerly locality of Mora. She graduated from Moragymnasiet in 2013 and later moved to Stockholm.

== Career ==
In February 2018, Oak collaborated with What So Not for the single "Beautiful", which won Best Independent Dance/Electronica/Club single at the AIR Independent Music Awards in July 2019.

In October 2018, Oak signed to Neon Gold and Atlantic.

Oak was featured on The Chainsmokers second studio album, Sick Boy (released December 2018), in the song "Hope". For the music video of the song, Oak appeared in "dressed in a tan trench coat and red flannel shirt".

On 10 December 2018, Oak released a music video for her cover of the song "Don't Save Me” by Haim, via Neon Gold and Atlantic.

Oak released her debut studio album Island of the Sun on 10 June 2022.

== Personal life ==
In 2026, she married Scottish musician Guy Berryman, who plays bass for British rock band Coldplay.

== Discography ==
=== Studio albums ===
Title	Details
Island of the Sun	Released: 10 June 2022; Label: Atlantic; Formats: Digital download, streaming, CD
Bloom	Released: 23 October 2026; Label: Queen of Lifestyle AB; Formats: Digital download, streaming, CD

=== EPs ===
Title	Details
Closure	Released: 10 January 2020; Labels: Neon Gold, Atlantic; Format: Digital download
She	Released: 23 October 2020; Labels: Neon Gold, Atlantic; Format: Digital download
Void	Released: 3 May 2024; Labels: Atlantic; Format: Digital download
Salt	Released: 7 February 2025; Labels: Atlantic; Format: Digital download

=== Singles ===
==== As lead artist ====
Title	Year	Peak chart positions			Album
Title	Year	CZE	SVK	SWI	Album
"Don't Save Me"	2018	—	—	—	Non-album single
"He Don't Love Me"	2019	—	—	—	Closure & Island of the Sun
"Break My Broken Heart"	2019	—	—	—	Closure & Island of the Sun
"Let Me Know"	2019	—	—	—	Closure
"Lonely Hearts Club"	2020	—	—	—	Closure
"Oxygen" (with Robin Schulz)	2020	7	33	81	Non-album single
"Thinking About You" (with R3hab)	2020	—	—	—	Non-album single
"With Myself"	2020	—	—	—	She
"Piano in the Sky"	2020	—	—	—	She and Island of the Sun
"She"	2020	—	—	—	She
"Winter Rain"	2021	—	—	—	Non-album single
"Nobody Loves Me" (featuring Elio)	2021	—	—	—	Non-album single
"Lonely Hearts Club" (with Leebada)	2021	—	—	—	Non-album single
"Old Insecurities"	2021	—	—	—	Non-album single
"World We Used to Know" (with Alan Walker)	2021	—	—	—	World of Walker
"Island of the Sun"	2022	—	—	—	Island of the Sun
"Baby Blue"	2022	—	—	—	Island of the Sun
"Jojo"	2022	—	—	—	Island of the Sun
"With or Without You"	2023	—	—	—	Void
"Fire Escapes"	2023	—	—	—	Void
"Fragile Thing"	2023	—	—	—	Void
"If I Were to Die"	2024	—	—	—	Void
"Inside Out" (featuring Boy in Space)	2024	—	—	—	Void
"You're Always High"	2024	—	—	—	Salt
"Where Do I Go" (with Nicky Romero, Vikkstar and Alpharock)	2024	—	—	—	Non-album single
"My Body"	2024	—	—	—	Salt
"I Broke Me First"	2024	—	—	—	Salt
"Another Life" (with NOTD)	2025	—	—	—	Digital Notes
"Someone Else" (with Harrison Storm)	2025	—	—	—	Empty Garden
"Do You Hate Me Now"	2025	—	—	—	Bloom
"Horses"	2026	—	—	—	Bloom
"Stay the Night"	2026	—	—	—	Bloom
"Breaking Point"	2026	—	—	—	Bloom
"Bones"	2026	—	—	—	Bloom
"Next Mistake" (featuring Maye)	2026	—	—	—	Bloom
"—" denotes a recording that did not chart or was not released in that territory.

==== As featured artist ====
Title	Year	Peak chart positions								Album
Title	Year	SWE	AUS	AUT	CZE	NL	NOR	NZ	SWI	Album
"Beautiful" (What So Not featuring Winona Oak)	2018	—	—	—	—	—	—	—	—	Non-album single
"Hope" (The Chainsmokers featuring Winona Oak)	2018	63	36	56	20	70	40	27	71	Sick Boy
"One by One" (Robin Schulz and Topic featuring Oaks)	2024	—	—	—	—	—	—	—	—	TBA
"Carry You" (Martin Garrix and Third Party featuring Oaks and Declan J Donovan)	2024	—	—	—	—	—	—	—	—	IDEM
"My Heart Goes" (Sam Feldt featuring Oaks)	2025	—	—	—	—	—	—	—	—	Time After Time
"Beliving In Us" (Cheat Codes featuring Oaks)	2025	—	—	—	—	—	—	—	—	Future Resonance
"Echo" (The Chainsmokers featuring Oaks)	2026	—	—	—	—	—	—	—	—	Love Is Kind
"—" denotes a recording that did not chart or was not released in that territory.

== Awards and nominations ==
List of awards and nominations
Ceremony	Year (Note: Indicates the year of ceremony. Each year is linked to the article about the awards held that year whenever possible.)	Recipient	Category	Result	Ref.
AIR Awards	2019	"Beautiful" (featuring What So Not)	Best Independent Dance, Electronica or Club Single	Won	
