= Oxygen (Winona Oak and Robin Schulz song) =

Single by Winona Oak and Robin Schulz
- Released: 28 May 2020
- Length: 3:12
- Label: Mentalo Music; Spinnin' Records
- Songwriters: Sam McCarthy; Robin Schulz; Paul Vogler; Casey Smith; Winona Oak; Daniel Dust
- Producers: Djani Dzihan; Robin Schulz; Paul Vogler

Winona Oak singles chronology
"Let Me Know" (2019)	"Oxygen" (2020)	"Thinking About You" (2020)

Robin Schulz singles chronology
"In Your Eyes" (2020)	"Oxygen" (2020)	"Alane" (2020)

Music video
- "Oxygen" on YouTube

"Oxygen" is a song by Swedish singer-songwriter Winona Oak and German DJ and record producer Robin Schulz. The song was released as a digital download on 29 May 2020. The song was written by Sam McCarthy, Robin Schulz, Paul Vogler, Casey Smith, Winona Oak and Daniel Dust.

== Background ==
Together with Spinnin' Records and his long-time label partner Warner Music Central Europe, Robin Schulz launched his own label called Mentalo Music. Schulz became the owner of the label at the end of May 2020, the label will establish new artists. "Oxygen" became the first single released under Mentalo Music.

== Music video ==
The official music video of the song was released on 28 May 2020 through Robin Schulz's YouTube account. The music video was directed by Christophe Mentz and Nassim Maoui.

== Track listing ==
Digital download
No.	Title	Length
1.	"Oxygen"	3:12

Digital download – Vintage Culture and Fancy Inc remix
No.	Title	Length
1.	"Oxygen" (Vintage Culture & Fancy Inc remix)	3:44

Digital download – Dario Rodriguez remix
No.	Title	Length
1.	"Oxygen" (Dario Rodriguez remix)	2:59

Digital download – Lucas Estrada remix
No.	Title	Length
1.	"Oxygen" (Lucas Estrada remix)	2:43

Digital download – Wave Wave remix
No.	Title	Length
1.	"Oxygen" (Wave Wave remix)	3:00

== Charts ==
Weekly chart performance
Chart (2020)	Peak position
Czech Republic Airplay (ČNS IFPI)	7
Slovakia Airplay (ČNS IFPI)	38
Switzerland (Schweizer Hitparade)	81
