= Alane (song) =

1997 song recorded by Wes

- French CD single

Single by Wes

from the album Welenga
- Language: Duala
- Released: 13 May 1997
- Genre: Dance-pop; world music
- Length: 3:40
- Label: Sony Music; Saint George; Epic
- Songwriter: Wes Madiko
- Producer: Michel Sanchez

Wes singles chronology
"Alane" (1997)	"Awa Awa" (1997)

Music video
- "Alane" on YouTube

Alternative cover
- Remixes

"Alane" is a song by Cameroonian musician Wes. It was produced by Michel Sanchez and is sung in the Duala language of Cameroon though the Tony Moran remix includes English lyrics. "Alane" was released in May 1997 as the lead single from Wes's first album, Welenga (1996), and became a hit across Europe, topping the charts of Austria, Belgium, France and the Netherlands. Its accompanying music video was directed by Philippe Gautier featuring choreography by Mia Frye.

== Critical reception ==
Pan-European magazine Music & Media wrote, "African chants meet state-of-the-art dance beats on this sizzling hot dance track, which has already been firmly entrenched atop the French charts for a couple of weeks." Alan Jones from Music Week declared it a "haunting" single and "likely to be the next Afro-European hit to make the grade here. Wes's expressive but slightly weak vocals are bolstered considerably by a pop/dance arrangement that fits like a glove, while some ethnic-sounding support bolsters the chorus." Chris Finan from Record Mirror Dance Update gave "Alane" a top score of five out of five, stating, "With over 2m copies already sold in France, this is certain to cause more than a stir here [in the UK]". A reviewer from Sunday Mirror gave it seven out of ten, adding, "This Euro-stomper with lots of wailing and chanting Afro-vocals is sure to be a huge hit in the nightclubs – and on the Terry Wogan show."

== Chart performance ==
In France, the song was sponsored by TF1, Fun Radio, RTL and the Malongo Coffees. The single spent ten weeks at number-one and remained in the top 50 for 25 weeks, ten of them at the top (and a further 9 weeks in the Top 10.)

The song also reached number-one in Belgium (9 weeks at number-one and a further 8 weeks in the top 10), Austria (8 weeks at number-one and a further 9 weeks in the top 10) and The Netherlands (8 weeks at number-one and a further 8 weeks in the top 10) as well as reaching the top 10 in Germany (where it spent 18 weeks in the Top 10), Hungary, Ireland, Israel and Switzerland (10 weeks in the top 10) and number 11 in the UK.

== Music video ==
The accompanying music video for "Alane" was directed by Philippe Gautier. The choreography was created by American-French singer Mia Frye, who had previously created the choreography for Los del Rio's "Macarena". Frye appears in both videos.

== Track listings ==
- 12-inch single
1. "Alane" (trouser enthusiasts orgasmic apparition mix) – 10:43
2. "Alane" (Trouser enthusiasts spectrophiliac dub) – 6:51
- CD single
1. "Alane" (radio mix) – 3:40
2. "Alane" (club remix – short version) – 3:37
- 12-inch maxi
1. "Alane" (trouser enthusiasts orgasmic apparition mix) – 10:43
2. "Alane" (trouser enthusiasts spectrophiliac mix) – 6:51
3. "Alane" (Todd Terry's club remix) – 8:04
4. "Alane" (Tony Moran's club mix) – 4:40
5. "Alane" (radio mix) – 3:40
- CD maxi – Todd Terry Remixes
1. "Alane" (radio mix) – 3:40
2. "Alane" (club mix – full version) – 8:06
3. "Alane" (drop mix – full version) – 8:07
4. "Alane" (club remix – short version) – 3:38
5. "Alane" (a capella) – 3:36
- CD maxi – Tony Moran Remixes
1. "Alane" (Tony Moran Main Pass Mix) – 4:39
2. "Alane" (Tony Moran Instrumental Mix) – 4:40
3. "Alane" (Tony Moran A Capella) – 4:40
4. "Alane" (Philcat Fishing Widow Mix) – 6:39

== Credits ==
- Written by Wes
- Composed, arranged and produced by Michel Sanchez
- Artwork by Design, Bronx (Paris)
- Photography (photo remix) by Laurent Edeline
- Photography (photo) by Yan Leuvrey
- Trouser enthusiasts orgasmic apparition mix: programmed by Torsten Gascoigne, produced by Trouser Enthusiasts
- Trouser enthusiasts spectrophiliac mix: remixed and produced by Trouser Enthusiasts
- Todd Terry's club remix: remixed by Todd Terry
- Tony Moran's club mix: remixed by Tony Moran

== Charts ==
=== Weekly charts ===
Chart (1997–1998)	Peak position
Austria (Ö3 Austria Top 40)	1
Belgium (Ultratop 50 Flanders)	1
Belgium (Ultratop 50 Wallonia)	1
Europe (Eurochart Hot 100)	5
France (SNEP)	1
Germany (GfK)	2
Hungary (Mahasz)	8
Iceland (Íslenski Listinn Topp 40)	14
Israel (Israeli Singles Chart)	7
Ireland (IRMA)	9
Netherlands (Dutch Top 40)	1
Netherlands (Single Top 100)	1
Norway (VG-lista)	20
Scottish Singles Sales (Official Charts)	15
Sweden (Sverigetopplistan)	19
Switzerland (Schweizer Hitparade)	4
UK Singles (Official Charts)	11
UK Dance (Official Charts)	27

=== Year-end charts ===
Chart (1997)	Position
Belgium (Ultratop 50 Flanders)	3
Belgium (Ultratop 50 Wallonia)	3
Europe (Eurochart Hot 100)	21
France (SNEP)	3
Netherlands (Dutch Top 40)	4
Netherlands (Single Top 100)	3

Chart (1998)	Position
Austria (Ö3 Austria Top 40)	3
Europe Border Breakers (Music & Media)	18
Germany (Media Control)	5
Netherlands (Dutch Top 40)	65
Netherlands (Single Top 100)	18
Switzerland (Schweizer Hitparade)	20

=== Decade-end charts ===
Chart (1990–1999)	Position
Austria (Ö3 Austria Top 40)	31
Belgium (Ultratop 50 Flanders)	6
Netherlands (Dutch Top 40)	7

== Certifications and sales ==
Region	Certification	Certified units/sales
Austria (IFPI Austria)	Platinum	50,000^{*}
Belgium (BRMA)	3× Platinum	150,000^{*}
France (SNEP)	Diamond	1,400,000
Germany (BVMI)	3× Gold	750,000^{^}
Netherlands (NVPI)	2× Platinum	150,000^{^}
Switzerland (IFPI Switzerland)	Gold	25,000^{^}
^{*} Sales figures based on certification alone.^{^} Shipments figures based on certification alone.

== Robin Schulz and Wes version ==
"Alane"

Single by Robin Schulz and Wes

from the album IIII
- Released: 19 June 2020
- Length: 2:55
- Label: Warner Music Central Europe
- Songwriter: Wes Madiko
- Producers: Michel Sanchez; Robin Schulz

Robin Schulz singles chronology
"Oxygen" (2020)	"Alane" (2020)	"All We Got" (2020)

German DJ and record producer Robin Schulz released a remake of the song on 19 June 2020 which is included on the album IIII (2021). Schulz had been a fan of the original 1997 song since he was 10 years old and got in touch with Wes via Warner Music. The two musicians met in Paris and then re-recorded the track in a studio in Germany. Its music video was directed by Robert Wunsch and features appearances by Schulz and Wes, along with footage of 30 dancers in 12 countries across the world, including Australia, Brazil, France, Germany, Kenya, Mexico, South Korea, Turkey, Tunisia, Vietnam, and the United States.

=== Track listings ===
Digital download
No.	Title	Length
1.	"Alane"	2:55

Digital download – Don Diablo remix
No.	Title	Length
1.	"Alane" (Don Diablo remix)	3:20

Digital download – Yves V remix
No.	Title	Length
1.	"Alane" (Yves V remix)	2:26

=== Charts ===
==== Weekly charts ====
2020 weekly chart performance for "Alane"
Chart (2020)	Peak position
Austria (Ö3 Austria Top 40)	3
Belgium (Ultratop 50 Flanders)	14
Belgium (Ultratop 50 Wallonia)	5
CIS Airplay (TopHit)	172
Czech Republic Airplay (ČNS IFPI)	84
France (SNEP)	15
Germany (GfK)	6
Germany Airplay (BVMI)	1
Hungary (Dance Top 40)	39
Hungary (Rádiós Top 40)	15
Hungary (Single Top 40)	12
Netherlands (Dutch Top 40)	4
Netherlands (Single Top 100)	11
Poland Airplay (ZPAV)	10
Slovenia (SloTop50)	6
Switzerland (Schweizer Hitparade)	7
Ukraine Airplay (TopHit)	71

2025 weekly chart performance for "Alane"
Chart (2025)	Peak position
North Macedonia Airplay (Radiomonitor)	13

2026 weekly chart performance for "Alane"
Chart (2026)	Peak position
North Macedonia Airplay (Radiomonitor)	7

==== Year-end charts ====
Year-end chart performance for "Alane"
Chart (2020)	Position
Austria (Ö3 Austria Top 40)	23
Belgium (Ultratop Flanders)	66
Belgium (Ultratop Wallonia)	54
Germany (GfK)	29
Hungary (Rádiós Top 40)	94
Netherlands (Dutch Top 40)	42
Netherlands (Single Top 100)	70
Switzerland (Schweizer Hitparade)	39

=== Certifications ===
Certifications and sales for "Alane"
Region	Certification	Certified units/sales
Austria (IFPI Austria)	Platinum	30,000^{‡}
Belgium (BRMA)	Gold	20,000^{‡}
France (SNEP)	Gold	100,000^{‡}
Germany (BVMI)	Gold	200,000^{‡}
Poland (ZPAV)	Gold	25,000^{‡}
^{‡} Sales+streaming figures based on certification alone.
