= Welenga =

Studio album by Wes Madiko and Michel Sanchez
- Released: 1996
- Length: 59:18
- Label: Sony
- Producer: Michel Sanchez

Wes Madiko and Michel Sanchez chronology
Welenga (1996)	Sinami (2000)

Professional ratings
Review scores
Source	Rating
Music Week	4/5 stars

Welenga is the debut album by Wes Madiko and Michel Sanchez, released in 1996 through Saint George Records. The album featured the European hit single "Alane" and reached the top 10 in Austria, France, the Netherlands and Portugal.

== Critical reception ==
Music Week wrote, "Powered by the Euro-hit "Alane", this is more proof that even if rock still sounds best in English, dance has many tongues and few boundaries as Cameroon dialect meets world beats head on." The magazine's Alan Jones wrote, "With his haunting single "Alane" likely to become a hit here [in the UK], as it has in the rest of Europe, Cameroonian singer Wes issues his album Welenga, where his ethnic style is diluted somewhat and mixes with the ethereal new age/world influences of Michel Sanchez, the man who created Deep Forest. The result is soothing and surprisingly moving. Wes's vocals lend poignancy to lyrics which few of his listeners can understand, while Sanchez provides diverse musical motifs to underpin proceedings. Refreshing."

== Track listing ==
1. "Awa Awa" – 4:28
2. "Alane" – 3:39
3. "Kekana" – 3:17
4. "Wezale" – 4:39
5. "Ken Mouka" – 3:43
6. "Mawaza" – 4:47
7. "Mindoulou" – 4:12
8. "Mizobiya" – 4:54
9. "Degue Wegue" – 3:35
10. "Ramende" – 4:03
11. "Woukase" – 4:26
12. "Welenga" – 5:05

=== 1998 release bonus tracks ===
1. "We Don't Need No War" – 3:50
2. "Midiwa Bol (I Love Football)" – 4:40

All songs by Madiko/Sanchez except tracks 13 (Madiko/Laurnea) and 14 (Madiko/Amaraggi).

== Personnel ==
- Wes Madiko
- Michel Sanchez
- Laurnea
- Tony Amaraggi

== Charts ==
=== Weekly charts ===
Chart (1996–1998)	Peak position
Austrian Albums (Ö3 Austria)	5
Belgian Albums (Ultratop Flanders)	13
Belgian Albums (Ultratop Wallonia)	12
Dutch Albums (Album Top 100)	7
French Albums (SNEP)	5
German Albums (Offizielle Top 100)	14
New Zealand Albums (RMNZ)	30
Swiss Albums (Schweizer Hitparade)	13

=== Year-end charts ===
Chart (1997)	Position
Belgian Albums (Ultratop Wallonia)	84
Dutch Albums (Album Top 100)	72
French Albums (SNEP)	48

Chart (1998)	Position
Austrian Albums (Ö3 Austria)	26
German Albums (Offizielle Top 100)	53
