= The Dancer (2000 film) =

- Film Poster
- Directed by: Frédéric Garson
- Screenplay by: Jessica Kaplan
- Story by: Luc Besson
- Produced by: Luc Besson
- Starring: Mia Frye; Garland Whitt; Rodney Eastman; Josh Lucas; Féodor Atkine; Jarrod Bunch; Cut Killer
- Cinematography: Thierry Arbogast
- Edited by: Sylvie Landra
- Music by: Pascal Lafa
- Production companies: EuropaCorp; TF1 Films Production
- Distributed by: ARP Sélection
- Release date: 19 May 2000; (Cannes Film Festival)
- Running time: 89 minutes
- Country: France
- Language: English
- Budget: FRF 77,000,000 (Estimated)

The Dancer is a 2000 English-language French drama film starring Mia Frye. It was written by Jessica Kaplan and Luc Besson (who also produced the film) and directed by Frédéric Garson. The film was first shown at the Cannes Film Festival on 19 May 2000.

== Plot ==
A young, mute dancer is a huge success at her neighborhood in Brooklyn. She dreams to become a professional dancer and struggles to make the cut in an audition for a Broadway show.

== Cast ==
- Mia Frye as India Rey
- Garland Whitt as Jasper Rey
- Rodney Eastman as Isaac
- Josh Lucas as Stephane
- Féodor Atkine as Oscar
- Jarrod Bunch as Bruno
- Cut Killer as DJ Atomic

== Reception ==
Shannon J. Harvey from Urban Cinefile called it "an interesting indy project for Luc Besson" and wrote: "most audiences should love this short-lived melodrama, even if it leaves them wanting more." Richard Scheib from Moria.co gave it two and a half stars and criticized several aspects of film, including the ending and dance numbers.
