= Island of the Sun =

Studio album by Winona Oak
- Released: June 10, 2022
- Genre: Electropop
- Length: 39:52
- Label: Atlantic
- Producer: Andrew Wells; Cameron Montgomery; Chris Lyon; Gustav Nyström; Julian Gillström; Madelene Eliasson; Max Cooke; Valley Girl

Winona Oak chronology
She (2020)	Island of the Sun (2022)	Void (2024)

Singles from Island of the Sun
- 1. "He Don't Love Me" Released: April 25, 2019; 2. "Break My Broken Heart" Released: August 8, 2019; 3. "Piano in the Sky" Released: October 2, 2020; 4. "Island of the Sun" Released: February 17, 2022; 5. "Baby Blue" Released: March 31, 2022; 6. "Jojo" Released: May 4, 2022

Professional ratings
Review scores
Source	Rating
PopMatters	3.5/5 stars

Island of the Sun is the debut studio album by Swedish singer-songwriter Winona Oak, released on June 10, 2022, through Atlantic Records.

== Track listing ==
Island of the Sun track listing

No.	Title	Writer(s)	Producer(s)	Length
1.	"Island of the Sun"	Johanna Ewana Ekmark; Nate Campany; Kate Morgan; Chris Lyon	Valley Girl; Lyon	2:56
2.	"Baby Blue"	Ekmark; Andrew Wells; Luke Niccoli; Sarah Solovay; Victoria Zaro	Wells	2:54
3.	"He Don't Love Me"	Ekmark; Glasper; Felix Flygare Floderer; Carl Silvergran; Oskar Sikow	Julian Gillström	3:29
4.	"Break My Broken Heart"	Ekmark; Sikow; Michelle Buzz	Gillström	3:34
5.	"Radio"	Ekmark; Wells; Max Wolfgang; Sylvester Willy Siversten	Wells	3:03
6.	"NDA"	Ekmark	Gustav Nyström	3:00
7.	"My Man"	Ekmark	Wells	3:00
8.	"Yours Tomorrow"	Ekmark	Madelene Eliasson	2:32
9.	"Nothing to Lose"	Ekmark	Nyström	2:53
10.	"Mother and Daughter"	Ekmark	Max Cooke	2:57
11.	"Piano in the Sky"	Ekmark; Cooke	Cooke	3:10
12.	"Happy You're My Ex"	Ekmark	Cameron Montgomery	3:00
13.	"Jojo"	Ekmark; Nyström; Joakim Berg	Nyström	3:24
Total length:				39:52
