= In Your Eyes (Robin Schulz song) =

Single by Robin Schulz featuring Alida

from the album IIII
- Released: 10 January 2020
- Genre: Eurodance
- Length: 3:28
- Label: Warner Germany
- Songwriter(s): Robin Schulz; Alida Garpestad Peck; Kristoffer Tømmerbakke; Erik Smaaland; Daniel Deimann; Junkx; Gaute Ormåsen
- Producer(s): Robin Schulz; Erik Smaaland; Kristoffer Tømmerbakke

Robin Schulz singles chronology
"Rather Be Alone" (2019)	"In Your Eyes" (2020)	"Oxygen" (2020)

Music video
- "In Your Eyes" on YouTube

"In Your Eyes" is a song by German producer Robin Schulz, featuring vocals from Norwegian singer Alida. It was released by Warner Music Group Germany to digital download and streaming formats on 10 January 2020. The song was written by Erik Smaaland, Kristoffer Tømmerbakke, Gaute Ormåsen and Alida Garpestad Peck, and produced by Robin Schulz and Daniel Deimann & Dennis "Junkx" Bierbrodt.

== Music video ==
The video was published on 10 January 2020. In the video, incarnations of Toni Garrn and Robin Schulz appear in a dark hall and next to them two futuristic motorcycles.

== Track listing ==
Digital download
No.	Title	Length
1.	"In Your Eyes" (featuring Alida)	3:28

Digital download – Lum!x remix
No.	Title	Length
1.	"In Your Eyes" (featuring Alida; Lum!x remix)	3:23

Digital download – Kream remix
No.	Title	Length
1.	"In Your Eyes" (featuring Alida; Kream remix)	3:23

Digital download – 8D audio version
No.	Title	Length
1.	"In Your Eyes" (featuring Alida; 8D audio version)	3:28

Digital download – Nicky Romero remix
No.	Title	Length
1.	"In Your Eyes" (featuring Alida; Nicky Romero remix)	3:18

Digital download – Clean Bandit remix
No.	Title	Length
1.	"In Your Eyes" (featuring Alida; Clean Bandit remix)	2:58

== Charts ==
=== Weekly charts ===
Chart (2020)	Peak position
Austria (Ö3 Austria Top 40)	3
Belgium (Ultratop 50 Flanders)	14
Belgium (Ultratop 50 Wallonia)	5
CIS Airplay (TopHit)	5
Croatia (HRT)	20
Czech Republic (Rádio – Top 100)	2
Czech Republic (Singles Digitál Top 100)	14
Europe (Euro Digital Songs)	13
France (SNEP)	52
Germany (GfK)	5
Hungary (Dance Top 40)	34
Hungary (Rádiós Top 40)	2
Hungary (Single Top 40)	17
Hungary (Stream Top 40)	29
Lithuania (AGATA)	52
Mexico Ingles Airplay (Billboard)	13
Netherlands (Dutch Top 40)	5
Netherlands (Single Top 100)	15
Norway (VG-lista)	17
Poland (Polish Airplay Top 100)	2
Romania (Romanian Radio Airplay)	9
Russia Airplay (TopHit)	3
Slovakia (Rádio Top 100)	16
Slovakia (Singles Digitál Top 100)	72
Slovenia (SloTop50)	5
Sweden (Sverigetopplistan)	71
Switzerland (Schweizer Hitparade)	5
Ukraine Airplay (TopHit)	48
US Hot Dance/Electronic Songs (Billboard)	11

=== Year-end charts ===
Chart (2020)	Position
Austria (Ö3 Austria Top 40)	12
Belgium (Ultratop Flanders)	27
Belgium (Ultratop Wallonia)	29
CIS (TopHit)	10
France (SNEP)	107
Germany (Official German Charts)	14
Hungary (Rádiós Top 40)	23
Netherlands (Dutch Top 40)	11
Netherlands (Single Top 100)	35
Poland (ZPAV)	9
Russia Airplay (TopHit)	7
Switzerland (Schweizer Hitparade)	9
US Hot Dance/Electronic Songs (Billboard)	51

Chart (2021)	Position
CIS (TopHit)	102
Russia Airplay (TopHit)	118

== Certifications ==
Region	Certification	Certified units/sales
Australia (ARIA)	Gold	35,000^{‡}
Austria (IFPI Austria)	2× Platinum	60,000^{‡}
Belgium (BRMA)	Platinum	40,000^{‡}
Canada (Music Canada)	Platinum	80,000^{‡}
Denmark (IFPI Danmark)	Gold	45,000^{‡}
France (SNEP)	Platinum	200,000^{‡}
Germany (BVMI)	3× Gold	600,000^{‡}
Italy (FIMI)	Gold	35,000^{‡}
Poland (ZPAV)	3× Platinum	150,000^{‡}
^{‡} Sales+streaming figures based on certification alone.
