= All This Love (Robin Schulz song) =

Single by Robin Schulz featuring Harlœ

from the album IIII
- B-side: "Speechless"
- Released: 3 May 2019
- Length: 2:44
- Label: Tonspiel; Warner
- Songwriter(s): Stuart Crichton; Dennis Bierbrodt; Jürgen Dohr; Guido Kramer; Tommy Lee James; Stefan Dabruck; Robin Schulz; Jessica Karpov; Daniel Deimann
- Producer(s): Stuart Crichton; Junkx; Robin Schulz

Robin Schulz singles chronology
| "Speechless" (2018) | "All This Love" (2019) | "Rather Be Alone" (2019) |

Music video
- "All This Love" on YouTube

"All This Love" is a song by German DJ and record producer Robin Schulz and American singer Harlœ. The song was released on 3 May 2019. The song was written by Stuart Crichton, Dennis Bierbrodt, Jürgen Dohr, Guido Kramer, Tommy Lee James, Stefan Dabruck, Robin Schulz, Jessica Karpov and Daniel Deimann.

== Music video ==
The official music video of the song was released on 9 May 2019 through Robin Schulz's YouTube account. The music video was directed by Robert Wunsch.

== Track listing ==
Digital download and stream
| No. | Title | Length |
|---|---|---|
| 1. | "All This Love" (featuring Harlœ) | 2:44 |
| 2. | "Speechless" (featuring Erika Sirola) | 3:37 |

Maxi CD
| No. | Title | Length |
|---|---|---|
| 1. | "All This Love" (original mix) | 2:47 |
| 2. | "All This Love" (Deepend remix) | 2:51 |
| 3. | "All This Love" (Offaiah remix) | 3:28 |
| 4. | "All This Love" (Hook n Sling remix) | 3:23 |
| 5. | "All This Love" (Joe Stone remix) | 2:58 |

== Charts ==
=== Weekly charts ===
| Chart (2019) | Peak position |
|---|---|
| Austria (Ö3 Austria Top 40) | 32 |
| Belgium (Ultratip Bubbling Under Wallonia) | 18 |
| Germany (GfK) | 24 |
| Hungary (Dance Top 40) | 34 |
| Hungary (Rádiós Top 40) | 15 |
| Switzerland (Schweizer Hitparade) | 28 |

=== Year-end charts ===
| Chart (2019) | Position |
|---|---|
| Germany (Official German Charts) | 76 |
| Hungary (Rádiós Top 40) | 79 |
| Switzerland (Schweizer Hitparade) | 77 |

== Certifications ==
| Region | Certification | Certified units/sales |
|---|---|---|
| Austria (IFPI Austria) | Gold | 15,000^{‡} |
| Germany (BVMI) | Gold | 200,000^{‡} |
| Poland (ZPAV) | Gold | 25,000^{‡} |
^{‡} Sales+streaming figures based on certification alone.
