= Gil Glaze =

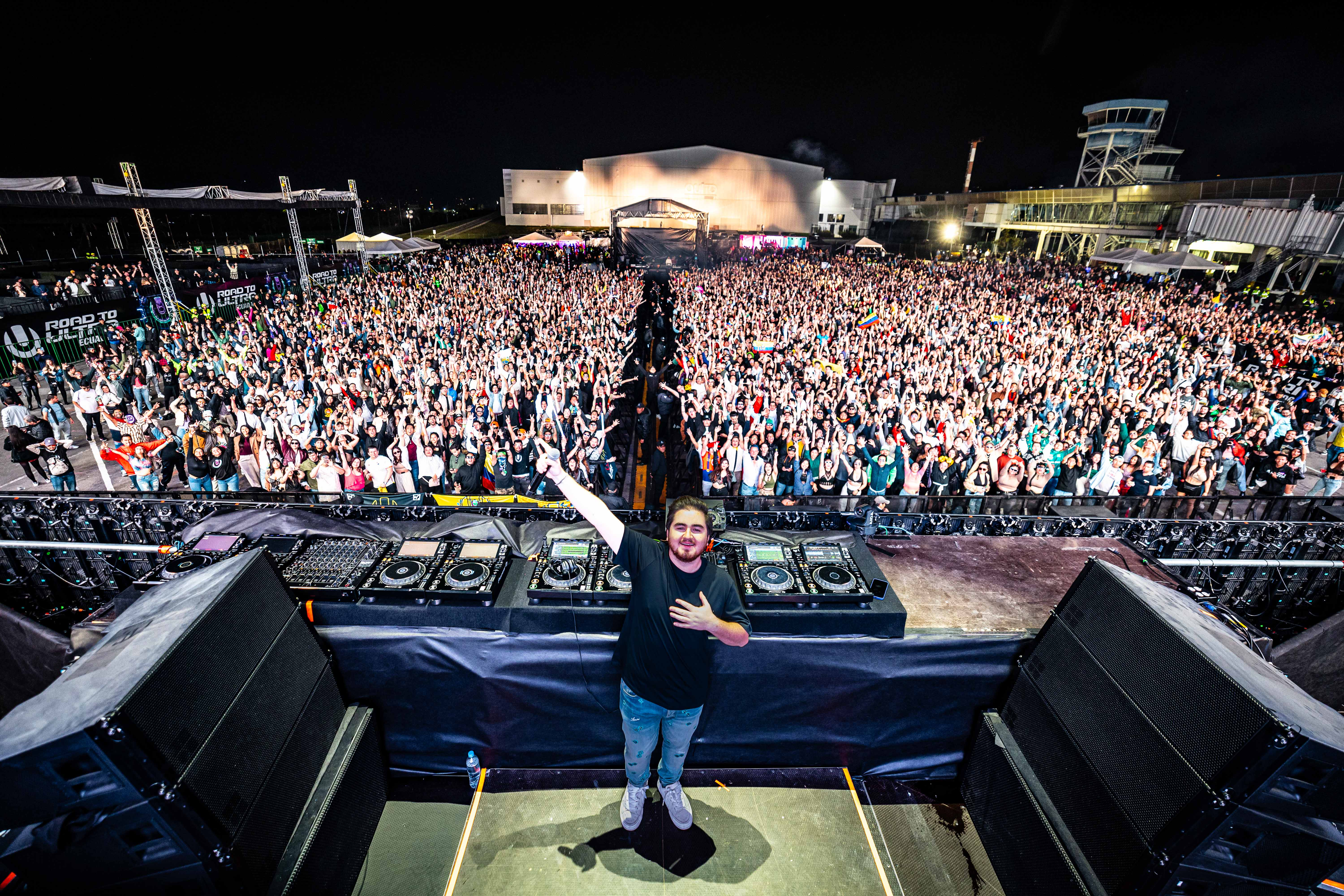
- DJ Gil Glaze at Road to Ultra Ecuador 2024

Background information
- Also known as: Gil Glaze, GLZ
- Born: January 28, 1994 (age 32); Zurich, Switzerland
- Origin: Zurich, Switzerland
- Genres: Dance; Pop music
- Years active: 2009–present
- Labels: Sony Music; Wall Recordings
- Website: gilglaze.com

Gil Glaze (born 28 January 1994) is a Swiss musician, DJ, songwriter and record producer. He is currently signed to Sony Switzerland and Afrojack's Wall Recordings.

Gil Glaze also performs under the alias GLZ (Techno).

== Early life ==
Gil Glaze was born and raised in Zurich, Switzerland to South African parents. He attended the Zurich International School while taking music, DJ'ing, producer and radio broadcasting courses at UCLA.

Gil Glaze is an alumni (2016) of the New York University Tisch School of the Arts at Clive Davis School of Recorded Music. His classmates included Maggie Rogers, Fletcher and Justin Jesso.

In New York Gil Glaze did internships at Atlantic Records and Primary Wave. In 2016 Gil moved back to Zurich Switzerland to focus on running his label Breeze Records.

In 2023 Gil graduated with a master of science in hospitality and tourism at the University of Southern California.

== Career ==
Gil Glaze began DJ'ing at local nightclubs in Zurich, Switzerland. He started to host his own nights called “Breeze” which later became the name for his record label.

When he moved to the United States he started DJ'ing for Tao Group Hospitality. This included playing their clubs across the country.

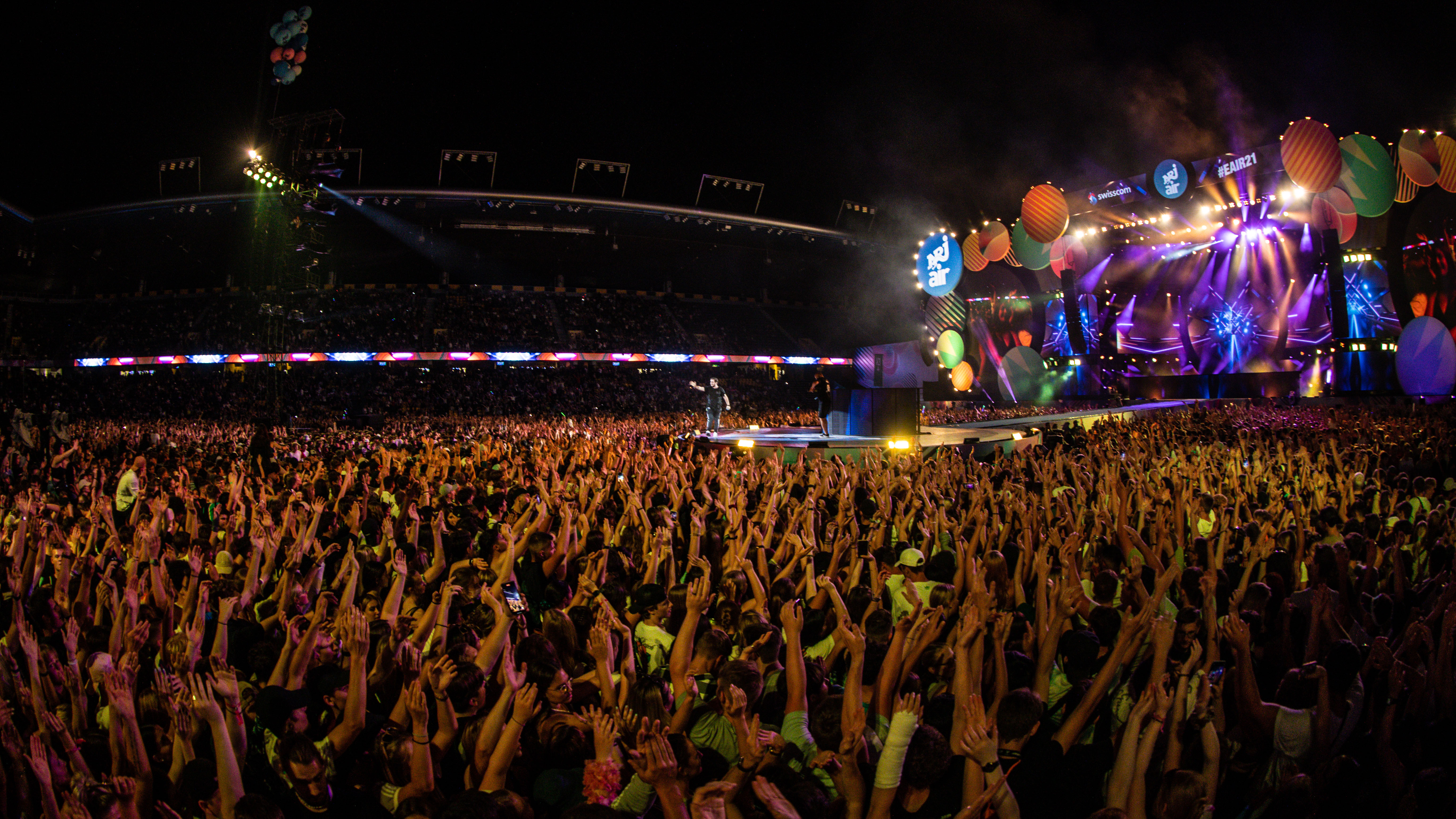
DJ Gil Glaze performing at Energy Air in 2021

In 2018 Gil Glaze's remix of “Young” by The Chainsmokers was picked up by their management. They then requested Gil Glaze to do a remix of “Honest” which was officially released by Columbia Records. This remix quickly gathered over a million streams and he was invited to join the duo on their Australia tour playing as their opener. In 2022 he also joined The Chainsmokers on their European tour.

In 2021 once Covid lockdowns were over Gil Glaze performed at Energy Air in 2021 at the Wankdorf Stadium in front of 40,000 people. He also played mainstage at festivals like Ultra Music Festival Miami, Ultra Japan, Ultra South Africa, Ultra Europe, Djakarta Warehouse Project and more.

In 2024 he signed with Afrojack's Wall Recordings for management, touring worldwide as the opener for Afrojack's performances. The same year Gil Glaze signed for a residency at XS Nightclub at the Wynn Hotel in Las Vegas.

== Discography ==
=== Singles & Original Releases ===
* Gil Glaze – “Jellyfish” (2014)

* Gil Glaze – “Vector” (2015)

* Gil Glaze – “Blue Mojito” (2015)

* Gil Glaze – “Light Up Your Heart” (2015)

* Gil Glaze – “You Don't Care for Me” (No Definition / August 31, 2015)

* Gil Glaze – “Feel the Heat” feat. Reggie Saunders (2016)

* Gil Glaze – “Let's Get It On” (2016)

* Gil Glaze – “Follow” feat. Ezrah (Enormous Chills / July 29, 2016)

* Gil Glaze – “Can't Let You Go” (Dirty Soul Music / November 4, 2016)

* Gil Glaze – “Endless Love” (No Definition / December 19, 2016)

* Gil Glaze – “Mother City” (Enormous Chills / April 21, 2017)

* Gil Glaze feat. Jared Hiwat – “I Need to Know” (2017)

* Gil Glaze feat. Madi Rindge – “Naked” (Sirup Music / June 2, 2017)

* Gil Glaze – “Wild and Free” (Armada Deep / January 29, 2018)

* Gil Glaze & Barkley – “Want From U” (Armada Deep / June 25, 2018)

* Gil Glaze – “How We Do” (Sirup Music / February 25, 2019)

* Gil Glaze & Emily Middlemas – “Me & Her & You” (2019)

* Gil Glaze feat. Annabel Turner – “Young Forever” (2019)

* Gil Glaze – “100 Reasons” (2019)

* Gil Glaze – “Vertigo” (2019)

* Gil Glaze – “Wasted” (2020)

* Josh Charm & Gil Glaze – “Talk to Me” (2020)

* Gil Glaze feat. Rika – “Addicted to the Rhythm” (2020)

* MANIBA, Gil Glaze & Penny F. – “I Want You” (2020)

* Gil Glaze feat. Jesper Jenset – “Not Like This” (2020)

* Gil Glaze & KOOLKID – “Wanted” (2021)

* Gil Glaze & Gia Koka – “Remember” (2021)

* Gil Glaze & Luis Torres feat. Georgi Kay – “Did Me Wrong” (2021)

* Gil Glaze – “West LA” feat. Dante Thomas (2021)

* Gil Glaze – “Ahead of Time” (2021)

* Gil Glaze feat. Georgi Kay – “The Green Light” (2021)

* Gil Glaze feat. Joe Taylor – “Love Me When I'm Gone” (2022)

* Gil Glaze – “Afterglow” (2022)

* Gil Glaze feat. Robbie Jay – “Personal” (2022)

* Gil Glaze feat. Arina Luisa – “Good Goodbye” (2023)

* Gil Glaze – “Domino” (2023)

* Gil Glaze & 7UBO – “U Can't” (2023)

* Gil Glaze & Rapture Boy – “Make You Move” (2023)

* Gil Glaze – “Falling” (2023)

* Gil Glaze, NAAK & Frigid Armadillo – “Through The Dark” (2023)

* Gil Glaze – “Over You” (2023)

* Gil Glaze – “Remind Me” feat. Amanda Collis (2024)

* Gil Glaze – “Beautiful Day” (2024)

* Gil Glaze – “Losing Grip” (2024)

* Gil Glaze & Afrojack – “Don't Go” (2024)

* Gil Glaze & Maria Mathea – “In My Head” (2024)

* Gil Glaze feat. Naomi Lareine – “Lifetime” (2025)

* Gil Glaze feat. KOOLKID – “Gold” (2025)

* Gil Glaze – “Human” (Sony Music / 2025)

* Julian Cross & Gil Glaze – “Somewhere Else” (2025)

* Gil Glaze & Afrojack feat. EVIE – “Hold On” (2025)

* Gil Glaze feat. Milune – “Test Drive” (2025)

* Gil Glaze & Tatana feat. Bastien – “Need Somebody” (2026)

* GLZ, Miss Monique, Kapuchon - "Hot Sauce" (2026)

=== Remixes ===
* Gil Glaze – “Funkhouse” (Antonio Giacca Remix) (2015)

* Gil Glaze – “You Don't Care for Me” (Remixes EP) (2015)

* Gil Glaze feat. Madi Rindge – “Naked” (Remixes EP) (2018)

* Gil Glaze – “Me & Her & You” (Remixes EP) (2019)

* Gil Glaze – “Vertigo” (Remixes EP) (2019)

* Gil Glaze & Gia Koka – “Remember” (Remixes EP) (2021)

* Gil Glaze – “Afterglow” (Remixes EP) (2022)

* ZIAN – “See The Light” (Gil Glaze Remix) (2021)

* Didi – “Sad Summer” (Gil Glaze Remix) (2023)

* Marshmello & Jonas Brothers – “Slow Motion” (Gil Glaze Remix) (Republic Records / 2024)

* Sombr – “12 to 12” (Gil Glaze Remix) (2026)

* Faithless – “Insomnia” (Gil Glaze Remix) (2026)
