= Encore une chance =

- Judges: Richard Cross; Mia Frye; Stéphane Joffre-Roméas; Morgan Serrano
- Original language: French
- No. of series: 1
- No. of episodes: 6

Original release
- Network: NRJ 12
- Release: 24 January – 27 February 2012

Encore une chance (meaning Again a chance in French, full title Encore une chance: Les plus belles voix de la téléréalités (meaning Again a chance: the most beautiful voices of reality television in French) is a French reality television show broadcast on French music television network NRJ 12 in January and February 2012, and comprising six shows with the first on 24 January 2012 and the finals on 27 February. The music competition gave a new chance to 32 contestants in various music competition shows in France that had failed to win in their bids giving them a new chance with two winners signing contracts with NRJ and given chances to record with established artist. The winner in the female category was Lucie Azard, a contestant from French Star Academy in season 7 held in 2007-2008. She won the chance to record in cooperation with Canadian singer K.Maro.

The winner in the female category was Lucie Azard, a contestant from French Star Academy in season 7 held in 2007-2008. She won the chance to record in cooperation with Canadian singer K.Maro.

Due to lower than expected viewership of the program, the series was moved from prime time to late night slot for the second half of the series.

== Jury ==
The jury was composed of music professionals:

- Richard Cross - a vocal coach
- Mia Frye - choreographer
- Morgan Serrano - DJ at NRJ Radio
- Stéphane Joffre-Roméas, a director at NRJ 12.

== Contestants ==
The 32 contestants, 16 male and 16 female, with none of them winners in the series they took part in, came from the following musical reality television series (winners in bold):

Name	Channel	Seasons	Male contestants	Female contestants
Star Academy	TF1	8 seasons from 2001 to 2008	Romain (2003, Star Academy 3); Pierre Mathyss (2005, Star Academy 5); Harold (2008, Star Academy 8)	Jessica Marquez (2001-2 Star Academy 1); Anne-Laure Sibon (2002, Star Academy 2); Hoda (2004, Star Academy 4); Cynthia Brown (2006, Star Academy 6); **Lucie Azard** (2006-7, Star Academy 7)
Popstars	M6	4 seasons 2001, 2002, 2003, 2007	Leandro (2002, Popstars 2); Rida (2002, Popstars 2)	Vanessa (2001, Popstars 1); Élodie (2002, Popstars 2); Lily (2002, Popstars 2); Ibtissem (2007, Popstars 4); Jessie (2007, Popstars 4)
Nouvelle Star	M6	8 seasons from 2003 to 2010	Charles (2004, Nouvelle Star 2); Malik (2005, Nouvelle Star 3); Bruno Rua (2006, Nouvelle Star 4); Julien-Baptiste (2006, Nouvelle Star 4); Tigane Drammeh (2007, Nouvelle Star 5); **Lary Lambert** (2009, Nouvelle Star 7); Thomas (2009, Nouvelle Star 7)	Babeth Lando (2004, Nouvelle Star 2); Lucille (2008, Nouvelle Star 6)
X Factor	W9 / M6	2 seasons 2009 / 2011	Adrien (2011, X Factor 2); Jordan (2011, X Factor 2); Nedjim (2011, X Factor 2); Slimane (2011, X Factor 2)	Cyrielle (2009, X Factor 1); Julie (2009, X Factor 1); Marie (2009, X Factor 1); Ana (2011, X Factor 2)

== Finalists / Winners ==
The 8 finalists who had the chance to compete in an episode registered in Canada were:

- Jessie Amseli
- Lucie Azard
- Cynthia Brown
- Tigane Drammeh
- Larry Lambert
- Nedjim Mahtallah
- Bruno Rua
- Anne-Laure Sibon

The 2012 winner in the male category was Larry Lambert, originally a contestant in Nouvelle Star in season 7 of the series in 2009. He won a chance to record in cooperation with Canadian singer Corneille.

The winner in the female category was Lucie Azard, a contestant from French Star Academy in season 7 held in 2007-2008. She won the chance to record in cooperation with Canadian singer K.Maro.

== Results table ==
Contestants (male)	Series	Eliminations	Contestants (female)	Series	Eliminations
Lary Lambert	Nouvelle Star 7	Winner (with Corneille)	Lucie Azard	Star Academy 7	Winner (with K.Maro)
Tigane Drammeh	Nouvelle Star 5	27 February 2012	Cynthia Brown	Star Academy 6	27 February 2012
Bruno Rua	Nouvelle Star 4	21 February 2012	Jessie	Popstars 4	27 February 2012
Nedjim	X Factor 2	21 February 2012	Anne-Laure Sibon	Star Academy 2	21 February 2012
Slimane	X Factor 2	14 February 2012	Babeth Lando	Nouvelle Star 2	21 February 2012
Pierre Mathyss	Star Academy 5	7 February 2012	Vanessa	Popstars 1	21 February 2012
Harold	Star Academy 8	31 January 2012	Jessica Marquez	Star Academy 1	7 February 2012
Romain	Star Academy 3	31 January 2012	Ana	X Factor 2	31 January 2012
Adrien	X Factor 2	24 January 2012	Hoda	Star Academy 4	31 January 2012
Charles	Nouvelle Star 2	24 January 2012	Julie	X Factor 1	31 January 2012
Jordan	X Factor 2	24 January 2012	Lily	Popstars 2	31 January 2012
Julien-Baptiste	Nouvelle Star 4	24 January 2012	Lucille	Nouvelle Star 6	31 January 2012
Leandro	Popstars 2	24 January 2012	Cyrielle	X Factor 1	24 January 2012
Malik	Nouvelle Star 3	24 January 2012	Élodie	Popstars 2	24 January 2012
Rida	Popstars 2	24 January 2012	Ibtissem	Popstars 4	24 January 2012
Thomas	Nouvelle Star 7	24 January 2012	Marie	X Factor 1	24 January 2012

== Viewers ==
Episode	Date	Time	Viewers	Share of market
1	Tuesday 24 January 2012	20:35-22:40	584,000	2.2%
2	Tuesday 31 January 2012	20:35-22:40	403,000	1.5%
3	Tuesday 7 February 2012	20:35-22:40	348,000	1.3%
4	Tuesday 14 February 2012	22:30-00:10	370,000	2.6%
5	Tuesday 21 February 2012	22:30-00:10	346,000	2.6%
6	Monday 27 February 2012	20:35-22:40	303,000	1.2%
