= IIII (album) =

Studio album by Robin Schulz
- Released: 26 February 2021
- Recorded: 2017–2020
- Label: Warner Music

Robin Schulz chronology
| Uncovered (2017) | IIII (2021) | Pink (2023) |

Singles from IIII
- 1. "Speechless" Released: 16 November 2018; 2. "All This Love" Released: 3 May 2019; 3. "Rather Be Alone" Released: 13 September 2019; 4. "In Your Eyes" Released: 10 January 2020; 5. "Alane" Released: 19 June 2020; 6. "All We Got" Released: 16 October 2020; 7. "One More Time" Released: 26 February 2021

IIII is the fourth studio album by German DJ and record producer Robin Schulz, released on 26 February 2021 through Warner Music. Schulz wrote around 50 songs over the span of four years for the album, which features collaborations conducted online due to the COVID-19 pandemic. IIII was supported by the singles "Speechless", "All This Love", "Rather Be Alone", "In Your Eyes", "Alane", and "All We Got". A seventh single, "One More Time" with Felix Jaehn, was released the same day as the album. The album's release was promoted by a drone light show in the Netherlands.

== Singles ==
"Speechless" was released as the lead single from the album on 16 November 2018. The song peaked at number seven on the German Singles Chart. "All This Love" was released as the second single from the album on 3 May 2019. The song peaked at number twenty-four on the German Singles Chart. "Rather Be Alone" was released as the third single from the album on 13 September 2019. "In Your Eyes" was released as the fourth single from the album on 10 January 2020. The song peaked at number five on the German Singles Chart. "Alane" was released as the fifth single from the album on 19 June 2020. The song peaked at number six on the German Singles Chart. "All We Got" was released as the sixth single from the album on 16 October 2020. The song peaked at number five on the German Singles Chart. "One More Time" was released as the seventh single from the album on 26 February 2021. The song peaked at number forty-six on the German Singles Chart.

== Critical reception ==
Der Spiegel rated the album 2/10, and calling it too "comfortable" and criticizing the "pseudo-emotional" guest appearances. 24UR gave the album a rating of 3.5/5, praising the trance influences and use of non-electronic instruments like guitars. A review by laut.de gave IIII one out of five stars and felts its songs were unoriginal and repetitive.

== Track listing ==
IIII track listing
| No. | Title | Length |
|---|---|---|
| 1. | "Intro" | 2:01 |
| 2. | "In Your Eyes" (featuring Alida) | 3:28 |
| 3. | "Speechless" (featuring Erika Sirola) | 3:29 |
| 4. | "Live and Let Live" (featuring Sam Martin) | 3:15 |
| 5. | "All We Got" (featuring Kiddo) | 3:10 |
| 6. | "Alane" (with Wes) | 2:54 |
| 7. | "Better with You" (featuring Svrcina) | 3:02 |
| 8. | "All This Love" (featuring Harlœ) | 2:45 |
| 9. | "One More Time" (with Felix Jaehn featuring Alida) | 3:19 |
| 10. | "Make Me Feel the Night" (featuring Tyler James Bellinger) | 3:26 |
| 11. | "It's Only for You" | 2:50 |
| 12. | "Kill the Fire" (featuring the Leonard) | 3:05 |
| 13. | "Dream" (featuring Colour Your Mind) | 3:11 |
| 14. | "Rather Be Alone" (with Nick Martin and Sam Martin) | 2:52 |
| 15. | "Float" | 3:29 |
| 16. | "Feel Something" (featuring Saygrace) | 2:51 |
| 17. | "Outro" | 2:12 |

== Charts ==
=== Weekly charts ===
Weekly chart performance for IIII
| Chart (2021) | Peak position |
|---|---|
| Austrian Albums (Ö3 Austria) | 29 |
| Belgian Albums (Ultratop Flanders) | 47 |
| Belgian Albums (Ultratop Wallonia) | 78 |
| Dutch Albums (Album Top 100) | 7 |
| French Albums (SNEP) | 50 |
| German Albums (Offizielle Top 100) | 9 |
| Hungarian Albums (MAHASZ) | 7 |
| Norwegian Albums (VG-lista) | 11 |
| Spanish Albums (Promusicae) | 99 |
| Swiss Albums (Schweizer Hitparade) | 9 |

=== Year-end charts ===
Year-end chart performance for IIII
| Chart (2021) | Position |
|---|---|
| Belgian Albums (Ultratop Flanders) | 137 |
| Belgian Albums (Ultratop Wallonia) | 179 |
| Dutch Albums (Album Top 100) | 52 |

== Certifications ==
Certifications for IIII
| Region | Certification | Certified units/sales |
|---|---|---|
| France (SNEP) | Gold | 50,000^{‡} |
| Netherlands (NVPI) | Gold | 20,000^{‡} |
^{‡} Sales+streaming figures based on certification alone.
