= Speechless (Robin Schulz song) =

Single by Robin Schulz featuring Erika Sirola

from the album IIII
- Released: 16 November 2018
- Recorded: 2018
- Length: 3:34
- Label: Warner Germany
- Songwriters: Robin Schulz; Christopher Braide; Teemu Brunila; Dennis "Junkx" Bierbrodt; Guido Kramer; Jürgen Rohr; Stefan Dabruck
- Producers: Robin Schulz; Junkx

Robin Schulz singles chronology
"Right Now" (2018)	"Speechless" (2018)	"All This Love" (2019)

Music video
- "Speechless" on YouTube

"Speechless" is a song by German producer Robin Schulz, featuring vocals from Canadian-Finnish singer Erika Sirola. It was released by Warner Music Group Germany, to digital download and streaming formats, on 16 November 2018. The song was written by Schulz, Chris Braide, Teemu Brunila, Dennis "Junkx" Bierbrodt, Guido Kramer, Jürgen Rohr and Stefan Dabruck. Production was handled by Schulz and Junkx.

== Track listings ==
Digital download
No.	Title	Length
1.	"Speechless" (featuring Erika Sirola)	3:34

Digital download – Lucas & Steve remix
No.	Title	Length
1.	"Speechless" (featuring Erika Sirola; Lucas & Steve remix)	3:16

Digital download – remixes EP
No.	Title	Length
1.	"Speechless" (featuring Erika Sirola; extended mix)	4:33
2.	"Speechless" (featuring Erika Sirola; Sini remix)	3:18
3.	"Speechless" (featuring Erika Sirola; Nicolas Haelg remix)	3:32
4.	"Speechless" (featuring Erika Sirola; Blank & Jones WhatWeDoAtNight remix)	3:17
5.	"Speechless" (featuring Erika Sirola; Quarterhead remix)	3:09
6.	"Speechless" (featuring Erika Sirola; Gil Glaze & Twenty Feet Down remix)	3:27

Digital download – Moti remix
No.	Title	Length
1.	"Speechless" (featuring Erika Sirola; Moti remix)	3:01

Digital download – Christmas version
No.	Title	Length
1.	"Speechless" (featuring Erika Sirola; Christmas version)	2:02

Maxi CD
No.	Title	Length
1.	"Speechless" (original mix)	3:36
2.	"Speechless" (Lucas & Steve remix)	3:18
3.	"Speechless" (Sini remix)	3:18
4.	"Speechless" (Nicolas Haelg remix)	3:33
5.	"Speechless" (Blank & Jones WhatWeDoAtNight remix)	3:19
6.	"Speechless" (Quarterhead remix)	3:10
7.	"Speechless" (Gil Glaze & Twenty Feet Down remix)	3:29

== Charts ==
=== Weekly charts ===
Chart (2018–2019)	Peak position
Austria (Ö3 Austria Top 40)	8
Belgium (Ultratop 50 Flanders)	13
Belgium (Ultratop 50 Wallonia)	19
Czech Republic Airplay (ČNS IFPI)	1
Finland (Suomen virallinen lista)	5
France (SNEP)	32
Germany (GfK)	7
Hungary (Rádiós Top 40)	2
Hungary (Dance Top 40)	23
Hungary (Single Top 40)	17
Hungary (Stream Top 40)	39
Italy (FIMI)	64
Lithuania (AGATA)	34
Netherlands (Dutch Top 40)	7
Netherlands (Single Top 100)	24
Poland Airplay (ZPAV)	2
Slovakia Airplay (ČNS IFPI)	4
Slovenia (SloTop50)	3
Spain (PROMUSICAE)	100
Sweden Heatseeker (Sverigetopplistan)	20
Switzerland (Schweizer Hitparade)	9
Ukraine Airplay (TopHit)	2
US Hot Dance/Electronic Songs (Billboard)	31

=== Year-end charts ===
Chart (2019)	Position
Austria (Ö3 Austria Top 40)	33
Belgium (Ultratop Flanders)	29
Belgium (Ultratop Wallonia)	58
CIS (Tophit)	31
Germany (Official German Charts)	27
Hungary (Dance Top 40)	72
Hungary (Rádiós Top 40)	5
Hungary (Single Top 40)	42
Netherlands (Dutch Top 40)	24
Netherlands (Single Top 100)	64
Poland (ZPAV)	16
Russia Airplay (Tophit)	45
Slovenia (SloTop50)	11
Switzerland (Schweizer Hitparade)	24
Ukraine Airplay (Tophit)	14
US Hot Dance/Electronic Songs (Billboard)	92

Chart (2020)	Position
Hungary (Rádiós Top 40)	88

== Certifications ==
Region	Certification	Certified units/sales
Australia (ARIA)	Gold	35,000^{‡}
Austria (IFPI Austria)	Platinum	30,000^{‡}
Belgium (BRMA)	Gold	20,000^{‡}
Canada (Music Canada)	Gold	40,000^{‡}
France (SNEP)	Platinum	200,000^{‡}
Germany (BVMI)	Platinum	400,000^{‡}
Italy (FIMI)	Platinum	50,000^{‡}
New Zealand (RMNZ)	Gold	15,000^{‡}
Poland (ZPAV)	3× Platinum	150,000^{‡}
Switzerland (IFPI Switzerland)	Platinum	20,000^{‡}
^{‡} Sales+streaming figures based on certification alone.
