= Wes (singer) =

Cameroonian musician (1964–2021)

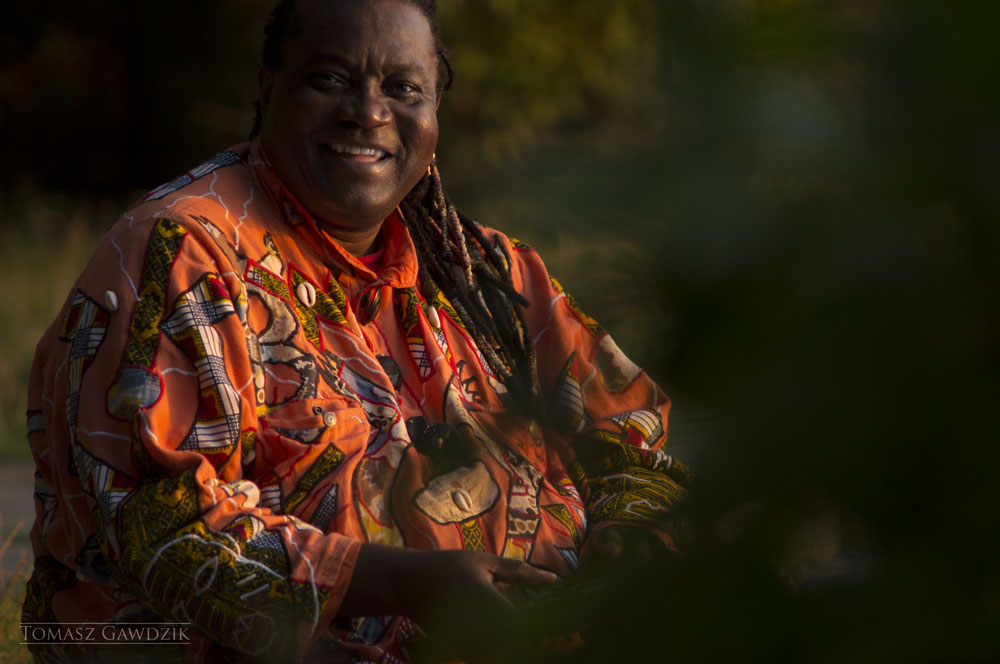

Background information
- Also known as: Wes Madiko
- Born: 15 January 1964
- Origin: Mouataba, Cameroon
- Died: 25 June 2021 (aged 57) Alençon, France
- Genres: World, ambient, electronic
- Years active: 1994–2021
- Label: Sony BMG/Existence Music

Wes Madiko (15 January 1964 – 25 June 2021), better known mononymously as Wes, was a Cameroonian musician. He is probably best known among Western audiences for his cover of "Upendi", from The Lion King II: Simba's Pride, as well as work with Deep Forest and his own 1997 hit "Alane" produced by Michel Sanchez.

== Background ==
Madiko was born in Mouataba, a village which is about hundred miles away from the city of Douala, Cameroon. He was taught about music by his grandfather, who taught him how to play the kalimba. His grandfather also taught him Bantu history and the wisdom of the elephant within animist Bantu philosophy. This was responsible for an important part of his education: "it was in bush school and during night-time gatherings listening to the metallic beat of the kalimba that I learned the adventures of the father of all ancestors, E'kwa Mutu."

In 1974, at the age of ten, Madiko became the conductor of the group Kwa Kwassi, which means "think right" or "just thought". This musical formation brought together the most talented youngsters in the village, who received instruction together in history and art.

== Musical career ==
In 1988, the group Fakol with Benjamin Valfroy and Jo Sene was formed. Fakol played in the Netherlands and in other countries throughout Europe. Aside from his musical activity, Wes started to develop an involvement in social work. He visited schools in Lille, and worked with children. Wes took great pleasure in transmitting the wisdom of the elephants and the ancient history of Africa.

Two years after, Jacques, Wes's brother and a talented guitarist, died. Their father died a few months later, following a motorbike accident. These incidents led Wes to meditate on the fragility of the self, saying: "there comes a time when a feeling of uselessness invades you and threatens to break you, but you hang in there, convinced that there's always a breath of life somewhere".

In 1992, Wes traveled to the US and released the album "Sun of Ancestors". During this tour, he gave concerts in Atlanta, Georgia. In this period Wes also met Michel Sanchez of Deep Forest with whom he formed an artistic collaboration, starting work on the album Welenga, which means "Universal Conscience". In 1996, Wes signed with Sony Music France to release Welenga. Thus Wes became one of the first stars of the group Deep Forest earning a Grammy Award.

He gave concerts in Sydney, Melbourne, Brisbane, in Japan, Hungary, Poland, and Prague. The French TV channel TF1 called "Alane" the summer song of the year 1997. From 1997 on, Wes performed a G7 concert with Deep Forest in Lyon, France, and is known as a multi-talented artist whose music enriches the world, as well for his humanity as an individual concerned with the plight of children and those less fortunate in the world. Wes is the first African artist with a recording going diamond. At the 10th Anniversary of the World Music Awards in Monaco, presided over by Prince Albert, Wes received the Award for best record sale of the year by an African artist (6 May 1998). In the same year he performed "I love Football" for the FIFA World Cup in France.

In 1998, Wes' song "Alane" was the opening song in a Chilean TV series named "Borrón Y Cuenta Nueva". In 2002, Wes' song "Awa Awa" was featured in Paramount Pictures' The Wild Thornberrys Movie, as well as the episode Falsche Partner of the German series Ein Fall für zwei. "Alane" was used in the German films Zahn um Zahn and Aus heiterem Himmel. In 2007, Wes was working on a new biography and spiritual book.

== Death ==
Wes died on 25 June 2021 at Alençon Hospital due to a nosocomial infection after a medical operation.

== Discography ==
=== Studio albums ===
Title	Details	Peak chart positions							
Title	Details	AUT	BEL (Vl)	BEL (Wa)	FRA	NED	NZ	SWI	POR
Welenga	Release date: 30 June 1996; Label: Saint George; Formats: CD	5	13	12	5	7	30	13	9
Sinami: The Memory	Release date: 2 October 2000; Label: Sony BMG; Formats: CD, music download	—	—	—	—	—	—	—	—
Melowe	Release date: 2010; Formats: CD	—	—	—	—	—	—	—	—
"—" denotes releases that did not chart

=== Singles ===
Year	Single	Peak chart positions										Album
Year	Single	AUT	BEL (Vl)	BEL (Wa)	FRA	GER	NED	NOR	SWE	SWI	UK	Album
1997	"Alane"	1	1	1	1	2	1	20	19	4	11	Welenga
1997	"Awa Awa"	—	50	—	—	—	44	—	—	—	—	Welenga
1998	"Midiwa Bôl" (I Love Football)"	—	—	—	94	71	72	—	—	49	75	Welenga
1999	"Doutou"	—	—	—	—	—	—	—	—	—	—	Non-album single
2000	"Keli Maye"	—	—	—	—	—	—	—	—	—	—	Sinami - The Memory
"—" denotes releases that did not chart
