= Anita Ratnam =

Indian classical and contemporary dancer and choreographer

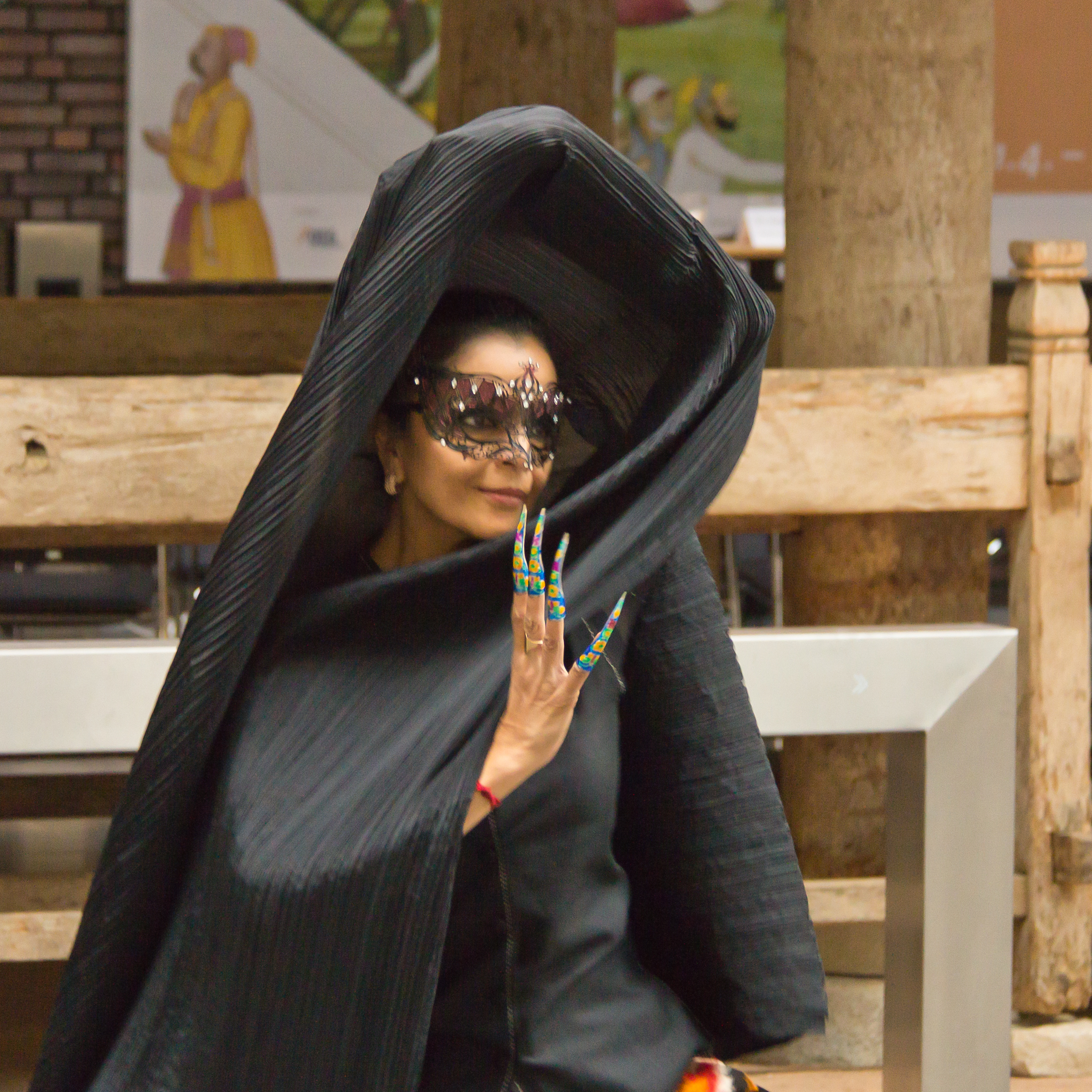
- Ratnam, 2012 in Cologne
- Born: Anita Raajyalaxmi Ratnam; 21 May 1954 (age 72); Ambala, Haryana, India
- Education: Kalakshetra (Postgraduate Diploma) (1974-1976)
- Alma mater: University of Madras (B.A.1971-1974) University of New Orleans (M.A.1977-1979) University of Madras (Ph.D.2008)
- Occupations: Dancer; Choreographer; Actress; Cultural Entrepreneur
- Years active: 1970 - present
- Known for: Neo Bharatam Founder Narthaki.com Founder Arangham Trust
- Board member of: Sangeet Natak Academy Executive Committee (2009-2014) Advisory Committee (2004-2009)
- Family: TVS Group
- Awards: Sangeet Natak Akademi Award; Kalaimamani; Nritya Choodamani
- Website: www.anitaratnam.com

Anita Raajyalaxmi Ratnam (Tamil pronunciation: [அனிதா ராஜ்யலட்சுமி ரத்னம்]; born 21 May 1954) is an Indian classical and contemporary dancer and choreographer whose work draws on both classical and contemporary performance traditions. Trained in Bharatanatyam, she has also received formal training in Kathakali, Mohiniattam, tai chi, and Kalarippayattu. She is known for developing "Neo Bharatam", a contemporary movement vocabulary that combines elements of Indian classical dance and other movement traditions.

== Early life and education ==
Anita Ratnam was born into the TVS family, which has longstanding associations with South Indian cultural institutions. Her paternal great-grandfather, T. V. Sundram Iyengar, is noted for supporting an early performance by M. S. Subbulakshmi, while her grandfather, T.S. Rajam, served as president of the Madras Music Academy. In interviews, Ratnam has described growing up in a traditional household. She stated that her mother, Leela Ratnam, who had wished to learn dance herself but did not have the opportunity to do so, encouraged her daughter to pursue dance training.

Ratnam began learning dance at the age of three under Rajee Narayan, a family friend and dance teacher. She gave her Arangetram at the age of nine. According to Ratnam, her paternal grandfather, T.S. Rajam, disapproved of her performing in public; however, with the support of her mother and guru, she continued to pursue dance.

She later studied Bharatanatyam under guru Adyar K. Lakshman, before joining Rukmini Devi Arundale's Kalakshetra where she obtained a postgraduate diploma in dance. At Kalakshetra, she studied Bharatanatyam, Sanskrit, and dance theory. Ratnam has credited the teacher Neila Sathyalingam with recognizing and encouraging her interest in exploring movement beyond the conventions of Bharatanatyam.

In addition to Bharatanatyam, Ratnam trained in Kathakali under Balasubramanian of Kerala Kalamandalam and in Mohiniattam under Thottassery Chinnammu Amma. She has stated that her training in these traditions significantly influenced her understanding of movement and abhinaya.

Alongside her dance education, Ratnam was active in sports, including tennis, hiking, and swimming. She has recalled that her dance teacher, Adyar K. Lakshman, encouraged her to focus primarily on Bharatanatyam rather than other physical pursuits. She has also described being actively involved in school and college cultural activities, including theater productions, which contributed to her early interest in drama and the performing arts.

At the age of 16, Ratnam performed at the Madras Music Academy in Chennai before an audience including Balasaraswati and M. S. Subbulakshmi.

In her late teens, Ratnam sought greater artistic and personal independence. In 1975, she was offered admission to the Martha Graham Center of Contemporary Dance in New York City. Instead, she chose to pursue graduate studies at the University of New Orleans, where she earned a master's degree in Theater and Television. During her time there, she studied drama and explored a range of artistic disciplines, an experience she has cited as influential in shaping her later work as a performer and choreographer.

Ratnam later completed doctoral research in Women's Studies at Mother Teresa Women's University, Chennai.

== Personal life ==
Ratnam is the eldest of three children, with a brother and a sister. Her mother, Leela Ratnam, was an important influence on her upbringing and artistic development. Leela was a civil engineer and artist who designed and built the family home in which Ratnam continued to live.

Ratnam has two children, a son, Shriman Narayan and a daughter, Arya Rajam. In 1988, while working as a television broadcaster in New York, Ratnam interviewed actress Shabana Azmi despite being nine months pregnant. She has recalled that her water broke immediately after the interview ended and she traveled to the hospital to give birth. Azmi later sent her flowers and a note recalling the incident.

Following the breakdown of her marriage, Ratnam returned to India in 1990 with her two young children. She has described herself as a single mother and credited her parents with supporting her decision to return and helping care for the children while she re-established her professional career. In a 2015 interview, Ratnam described having raised her children as a single parent for 27 years. She identified her daughter as Arya Saraswathi, a novelist, and her son as Shriman Narayan, who had a degree in filmmaking. She described both children as creative and independent. Her daughter Arya grew up with Ratnam and her maternal grandparents in Chennai. Ratnam supported daughter's interest in writing and encouraged her to pursue further study in the United States. In an interview, the two described their creative approaches as different but mutually supportive.

Ratnam has also spoken about the influence of her family on her artistic work. In 2011, she and her sister, Pritha, presented the dance production Andal Andal as a tribute to their late mother, acknowledging her contribution to their training as performing artists. The production marked their return to performing together after several years apart.

== Career ==
Over a career spanning more than five decades, Ratnam has worked as a performer, choreographer, television producer, arts entrepreneur, writer, curator, and cultural advocate. She has performed internationally in more than 27 countries.

=== Television career ===
Ratnam moved to the United States in the mid-1970s, where she temporarily stepped away from performing as a dancer while pursuing a career in television. Between 1976 and 1990, she worked as a television producer and presenter, producing weekly programs featuring Indian news, travel, cinema, and cultural programming for audiences in the United States. Beginning in 1981, she produced and presented Cinema Cinema for Channel 47 low-power TV stations in the United States covering Indian cinema, culture, and current affairs. In 1984, she launched Indigo - The Colors of India, another television programme focusing on Indian arts and culture.

Ratnam has stated that her years in television significantly influenced her later work in dance production, storytelling, stage design and multimedia presentation.

=== Return to India and Arangham ===
Following her return to India in 1990, Ratnam chose not to resume conventional Bharatanatyam performance. Instead, she began developing a contemporary performance practice rooted in classical movement while drawing upon her experiences in theater and television. She founded Arangham Trust in Chennai in 1992, followed by Arangham Dance Theatre in 1993. Ratnam has stated that the Trust was created to bring together her experience in television and media with her background in indian dance, serving as an umbrella organization for her work in performance, production, documentation, and arts education.

Through Arangham Trust she has organized talks, performances, educational programs, workshops, lecture-demonstrations, and interdisciplinary arts initiatives dedicated to promoting Indian performing arts.

=== Narthaki.com ===
One of the earliest initiatives of Arangham Trust was Narthaki.com, originally conceived as a printed directory of Indian classical dancers, dance institutions, and cultural organizations. The first edition contained contact information for more than one thousand dancers and dance-related organizations. A second expanded edition, published in 1997, added approximately two thousand further listings.

In 2000, the project evolved into Narthaki.com, an online portal providing information on Indian dance, performers, institutions, festivals, reviews, and related cultural activities. According to Ratnam, the initiative was intended to improve communication among artists, organizers, and audiences while increasing public access to information on Indian dance.

Through Narthaki.com, she has written regularly on issues affecting the Indian dance ecosystem, including arts funding, dance education, performance opportunities and cultural policy.

Narthaki.com has been recognized by the New York Public Library as a resource on Indian dance. The platform later expanded to include digital dance productions, festival curation, interviews, reviews, and other media initiatives.

=== Kaisika Natakam revival ===
Ratnam has been associated with the revival and documentation of Kaisika Natakam, a traditional temple theater form historically performed at the Vaishnava Nambi and Thirukurungudivalli Nachiar temple in Tamil Nadu. According to The Hindu, her interest in the tradition developed through theater scholar "Nataka" Ramanujan and her longstanding association with Thirukkurungudi, where the performance had historically been presented by Devadasi performers.

Beginning in 1999, Ratnam collaborated with Ramanujan and other scholars and artists to reconstruct the nearly forgotten performance tradition through archival research, oral histories, documentation, and performer training. The project sought to preserve the ritual character of the performance while restoring it to its temple setting rather than adapting it for conventional theater venues.

She has described the revival as an effort to document and preserve an important aspect of Tamil temple performance heritage that risked disappearing following the decline of the Devadasi tradition.

=== Performing arts initiatives ===
In addition to choreography and performance, Ratnam has curated festivals, conferences, and educational programmes devoted to Indian performing arts.

She co-founded and co-curated The Other Festival, described as India's first annual contemporary dance festival. In 2013, she organized Purush, a conference examining the contribution of male dancers to Indian classical dance.

Ratnam has organized numerous performance platforms featuring both established and emerging artists and has incorporated pre-performance talks into several productions to provide audiences with historical and artistic context. She has also delivered lectures and conducted workshops for universities, cultural organizations, corporate institutions, and youth forums.

=== Cultural leadership ===
Ratnam has served on advisory and executive bodies connected with Indian cultural policy and the performing arts, including the Sangeet Natak Akademi, the Indian Council for Cultural Relations, and the committees of the Ministry of Culture (India). She is a voting member of the Dance Critics Association in the United States, and a Fellow of the World Academy of Art and Science. Ratnam has also served as a visiting professor at the University of California, Irvine, and the University of California, Riverside, where she has lectured on Indian dance and performance traditions.

=== Other activities ===
According to Ratnam, curiosity has been a driving force throughout her career, describing her artistic approach as a 360-degree cultural ecosystem encompassing choreography, production, theater, writing, curation, technology, and arts administration. She has also emphasized the importance of training dancers not only in performance but also in production, technical theater, and professional practice.

She has stated that she deliberately chose not to establish a conventional dance school, stating that this decision allowed her greater freedom to pursue choreography, experimentation, and new artistic directions.

In 2000, Ratnam made her film acting debut in Rajeev Menon’s Kandukondain Kandukondain.

== Neo Bharatam ==
=== Concept and development ===
According to Ratnam, the term "Neo Bharatam" emerged in 1999 after she watched the film The Matrix and identified with the character Neo, portrayed by Keanu Reeves. She has said that the concept reflected both her multidisciplinary artistic training and her desire to develop an approach that extended beyond conventional boundaries of Indian classical dance. She has described Neo Bharatam as both a movement vocabulary and a contemporary artistic philosophy rooted in Indian classical dance while incorporating theater, interdisciplinary collaboration, and new choreographic approaches.

Drawing on her training in Bharatanatyam, Kathakali, Mohiniyattam, Tai chi, Kalaripayattu, and Yoga, Ratnam developed "Neo Bharatam", a movement language combining elements of these disciplines for contemporary performance and storytelling. She has acknowledged theater director Na. Muthuswamy of Koothu-P-Pattarai as an important influence during her search for a contemporary performance language. She has also questioned the exclusive emphasis on conventional Abhinaya in Indian classical dance, describing Natya as an integration of speech, movement and music.

=== Themes and artistic philosophy ===
According to Ratnam, her choreographic practice emerged from a desire to move beyond traditional dance narratives, particularly conventional representations of women in classical literature. She described her performances as focusing on stronger female perspectives and themes relating to women's experiences, identity and agency.

Drawing on her Sri Vaishnava heritage, Ratnam frequently revisits mythological narratives through contemporary perspectives, exploring themes including devotion, identity, resistance, and feminine agency. Her choreographic work seeks to re-examine traditional representations of women in mythology through contemporary interpretations.

She has argued that artists should engage with political and social issues through artistic practice rather than direct activism.

=== Performance style ===
According to Ratnam, over time, her choreographic practice shifted away from technical virtuosity associated with younger performers toward a greater emphasis on theatrical, narrative, and expressive interpretation. She regarded this approach as "dancing my age", explaining that her performances increasingly prioritize abhinaya, dramatic expression, and mature interpretation over conventional rhythmic display. Her productions combine dance, theater, spoken text, music, and visual design, frequently incorporating symbolic props and multilingual storytelling within contemporary performance settings.

Ratnam was among the early classical dancers to regularly employ recorded soundscapes instead of traditional live orchestras in her productions, a practice she has described as an important part of her theatrical approach.

=== Artistic influence ===
Ratnam has written extensively about the influence of fashion, textiles, jewellery, and craft traditions on her artistic practice. She has described her long-standing practice of collecting contemporary jewellery from museums around the world for more than four decades, viewing the pieces as expressions of local craftsmanship, design history, and cultural identity.

She described her choreography as carefully structured, placing emphasis on spatial design, movement patterns and visual composition while deliberately incorporating improvisation, drawing on her background in theater to respond to audiences.

Ratnam's productions place significant emphasis on visual design. Reviews have noted her integration of costumes, lighting, props, live music and scenography into a unified theatrical experience.

=== Critical reception ===
Ratnam has said that the critical reception to her early Neo Bharatam productions was initially cautious, with some critics expressing concern that her collaborative approach departed from the conventions of Indian classical dance. According to Ratnam the interdisciplinary approach was intended to respond to changing contemporary audiences and to expand the visual and theatrical language of Indian dance. She has emphasized collaboration across costume design, lighting, scenography, and music composition as integral elements of her productions, describing visual design as an important component of live performance.

=== Mentorship ===
Ratnam has mentored younger dancers through interdisciplinary programmes emphasizing collaboration, improvisation, theater, movement analysis, lighting production skills and professional development. She has argued that mentorship should encourage questioning, experimentation and cross-disciplinary learning rather than hierarchical guru-disciple relationships. Ratnam also mentored dancers through the production Padme over several years.

== Choreographies ==
Ratnam's choreographic work spans more than five decades and combines Indian classical dance, theater, spoken text, visual design, and contemporary movement. Many of her productions interpret mythology, ritual traditions, and female figures from Indian literature through the framework of Neo Bharatam.

- 1997 - "A Map to the Next World", created in collaboration with Native American poet Joy Harjo.
- 1998 - "Inner World", created with Pangea World Theatre, Minneapolis.
- 1998 - "Adhirohana: The Ascent"
- 1999 - "Daughters of the Ocean", created with writer Shobita Punja. The work reinterpreted the goddesses Lakshmi, Durga, and Saraswati through contemporary movement vocabulary and theatrical narration, presenting them as everyday women rather than idealized divine figures.
- 2002 - "Dust", created with Mark Taylor of Dance Alloy, Pittsburgh, USA.
- 2002 - "Ma - Hyphenated", created for dancer Lata Pada, Toronto, Canada.
- 2003 - "Vaitharani"
- 2005 - "Seven Graces: The many hues of Goddess Tara, created with Canada-based Hari Krishnan
- 2006 - "Neelam: Drowning in Bliss"
- 2006 - "Vortext", created with Canadian dance artist Peter Chin
- 2007 - "FACES: Blessed unrest"
- 2007 - "Gajaanana: The God of Good Things"
- 2008 - "Prism", created with the Toronto-based choreographer Harikrishnan
- 2008 - "Framing Five"
- 2009 - "MA3KA: The Triad Supreme", a contemporary dance-theater production conceived as a tribute to women, exploring female relationships across generations through dance, storytelling and music. The production featured narration by Revathi Sankaran and Vedanth Bharadwaj.
- 2010 - "A Million Sitas"
- 2011 - "Andal Andal"
- 2012 - "Avani - a handful of dust". A dance theater production
- 2013 - "Padme: the lotus", created with Netherlands-based dancer Kalpana Raghuraman, produced by Korzo Productions, Netherlands
- 2014 - "Spirals: Mythology of the sacred feminine"
- 2014 - "Circles of Love: Woman as mother"
- 2017 - "Ah-Su-Ra: A Ramayana triptych" .
- 2019 - "Stone: Ahalya and the many faces of her gender".
- 2019 - "Naachiyar Next", a dance-theater production based on the life and poetry of the Tamil Saint poet Andal. The work combines dance, theater, music, narration, and poetry, and was later reworked for a younger audiences.
- 2024 - Warrior Women of Bharat, a dance-theater production exploring the lives of the women associated with India's freedom movement, including Captain Lakshmi Sahgal.

== Writing ==
Ratnam has written extensively on Indian dance, museums, fashion, design, craft traditions, cultural policy, arts administration, gender, and performing arts. She has contributed essays to The Hindu and other publications on these subjects. Her writings frequently examine the relationship between tradition and contemporary practice, while advocating greater recognition of museum collections, traditional craftsmanship, and India's artistic heritage.

Ratnam has also written about the challenges facing Indian dance, including arts funding, programming, dance criticism, and institutional support for emerging artists.

Ratnam has written about the relationship between technology, digital media, and contemporary performance.

== Public engagement ==
Ratnam is an active speaker on dance, technology, culture and the performing arts. She has participated in literary festivals, conferences, and public discussions on culture, history, gender, and the relationship between digital media and contemporary artistic practice.

During the COVID-19 pandemic, she expanded her public engagement through online talks, interviews, and discussions on social media platforms. She has participated in literary festivals and interdisciplinary cultural events combining literature, theater, dance, and public history. In 2024, she appeared at the Lit for Life in a panel discussion on women nationalists alongside activist Shalin Maria Lawrence and Kathak dancer Shovana Narayan.

At The Hindu Lit for Life 2026, she participated in a theatrical reading from The Tamils: A portrait of a Community by Nirmala Lakshman. The presentation combined narration, classical dance, music, and readings from Sangam literature, Tevaram, Naalayira Divya Prabandham, and Subramania Bharati's poetry to explore the history, and cultural heritage of Tamil society.

She created Awakening, a series of early morning music performances held during Chennai's Margazhi season at Spaces in Besant Nagar. Established in memory of her mother, Leela Ratnam, the series featured collaborations with musicians including pianist Anil Srinivasan.

In 2026, she participated in the launch of Mastery, a documentary film series by StoneX Global exploring artistic practice and creative process. At the New Delhi preview, she appeared alongside Hindustani vocalist Shubha Mudgal in a panel discussion on artistic practice.

=== Public advocacy ===
Ratnam has written extensively on the state of Indian dance and the performing arts. Through opinion pieces, essays, and public commentary, she has advocated for greater institutional support for emerging dancers, more transparent festival programming, stronger arts criticism, and increased collaboration between artists, educators, cultural organizations and government bodies to strengthen the professional dance ecosystem in India.

== Personality rights ==
In 2025, Ratnam filed a civil suit before the Madras High Court alleging infringement of her personality rights after her photographs, videos, and AI-generated deepfake voice recordings were used in fraudulent social media accounts promoting investment schemes. The Madras High Court directed Meta Platforms and Telegram (software) to remove the identified fake accounts and channels upon notification by Ratnam.

== Awards ==
Year	Award	Category	Awarded by	Notes
1996	Nritya Choodamani	Bharatanatyam	Sri Krishna Gana Sabha	
1998	Kalaimamani	Classical and contemporary dance	Government of Tamil Nadu	Recognized contributions to dance.
2013	Vishwa Kala Bharathi		Bharat Kalachar	
2016	Sangeet Natak Akademi Award	Contemporary dance	Sangeet Natak Akademi	Awarded in recognition of nearly twenty five years of developing contemporary performance rooted in Indian classical movement traditions.
2017	Vishwa Kala Ratna	Narthaki.com	Milapfest	Award recognized Ratnam's contribution through Narthaki.com, which has documented, reviewed, and provided commentary on Indian dance since its launch in 2000.
2026	Iconic Excellence Award	Dance & Performing Arts	WION	Recognized for her contribution to dance and the performing arts.

== Legacy ==
Ratnam has emphasized digital preservation as an important aspect of her work,describing digital media and Narthaki.com as central to documenting Indian dance and expanding access to information about the art form. Her work has combined performance, choreography, arts entrepreneurship, digital documentation, and cultural advocacy, contributing to contemporary discourse on Indian dance while expanding its visibility through both live performance and online platforms.
