= Sarada Hoffman =

Indian Bharatanatyam exponent (1929–2025)

- Born: Alladi Sarada; 14 June 1929; Madras, Madras Presidency, British India
- Died: 14 September 2025 (aged 96)
- Occupations: Dance, teacher
- Known for: Bharatanatyam
- Awards: Sangeet Natak Akademi Award (1996)

Sarada Hoffman (born Alladi Sarada; 14 June 1929 – 14 September 2025) was an Indian Bharathanatyam dancer and dance teacher from Chennai, Tamil Nadu, India. In 1996, she received the Sangeet Natak Akademi Award for her contribution to Bharatanatyam.

== Background ==
Alladi Sarada (later Sarada Hoffman) was born in Madras, Madras Presidency, British India in 1929. She grew up in the Theosophical Society Adyar, where children lived and studied under the leadership of George Arundale. When her parents moved to Madurai, Rukmini Devi Arundale took Sarada under her care and made her stay at the Kalakshetra hostel. She stayed at the same hostel as a student and later as a teacher until she married Peter Hoffman in 1960.

There were two Saradas at Kalakshetra institute of Rugmini Devi. Due to the age difference, the older Sarada, who joined first, came to be known as "Periya Sarada" and the younger Sarada Hoffman as "Chinna Sarada".

Sarada studied Bharatanatyam at Kalakshetra under Rukmini Devi Arundel, Pandanallur Chokkalingam Pillai and Mylapore Gowri Ammal. She also received training in Kathakali from Kathakali gurus like Ambu and Chandu Panicker. After completing her studies in 1947, she was appointed a dance teacher at Kalakshetra and one of its principal dancers.

== Career ==
Initially, Hoffman performed as part of the Kalakshetra troupe but later focused on teaching and composing Bharatanatyam. Many noted dancers and teachers, including Yamini Krishnamurthy, Adyar K. Lakshman, C. V. Chandrasekhar, Shantha and Dhananjayan, have trained under her. After retiring from Kalakshetra as the head of the dance department in 1989, she served as an emerita member of Kalakshetra until 1996.

== Personal life and death ==
In 1960, she married Peter Hoffman. They had two children, Krishna and Geeta. They lived at Valmiki Nagar, Thiruvanmiyur, Chennai.

Sarada Hoffman died on 14 September 2025, at the age of 96.

== Awards and honours ==
Hoffman received the Sangeet Natak Akademi Award in 1996 for her contributions to Bharatanatyam. In 2001, she received the first Rukmini Devi Medal for Excellence in the Arts, established by the Centre for Contemporary Culture, New Delhi.
