= Satyavati Motiram Sirsat =

Indian cancer researcher

- Born: Satyavati Motiram; 7 October 1925; Karachi
- Died: 10 July 2010 (aged 84)
- Occupation: Cancer researcher

Satyavati Motiram Sirsat (7 October 1925 – 10 July 2010) was an Indian cancer researcher.

== Early life ==
Sirsat was born in Karachi, but lived in various cities as a girl. Her Gujarati parents were Theosophists, and she attended Kalakshetra, a theosophy-based school in Chennai, run by George Arundale and Rukmini Arundale. She earned a bachelor's degree in microbiology at St. Xavier's College in 1947, and completed doctoral studies in pathology at Tata Memorial Hospital for Cancer in 1958. She pursued further studies in electron microscopy in London in 1958.

== Career ==
Sirsat began the first electron microscopy laboratory to study cancer in India. She was founder and president of the Electron Microscope Society of India. Her research, which focused on oral submucous fibrosis, was published in Nature, Carcinogenesis, Tumori Journal, Journal of Cell Science, Journal of Investigative Dermatology, and other scholarly journals. She served on the editorial boards of other journals, including the Indian Journal of Experimental Biology Education, and Journal of Biosciences. She became a fellow of the Indian Academy of Sciences in 1975.

Sirsat retired from research in 1985, and became a social worker and medical ethicist, and took an interest in ayurvedic interventions as cancer treatment. She was active in hospice work, and wrote Death, the Final Freedom (1998) about this work.

Sirsat advised aspiring scientists, "Be honest to your work and true to yourself. Be disciplined. Never disparage the work of your fellow scientists. Be observant — never distort your log or show records to fit a preconceived theory. Above all, life is to learn — so learn, learn and learn!"

== Personal life ==
Satyavati Motiram married fellow cancer researcher M. V. Sirsat. She died from cancer in 2010, aged 84 years.
