= K. N. Dandayudhapani Pillai =

Indian choreographer

K. N. Dhandayuthapani Pillai
- Born: 14 July 1921; Karikal (Karaikal), French India
- Died: 12 October 1974 (aged 53); Karaikal (Karikal), Pondicherry, India
- Occupations: Classical dancer Choreographer
- Known for: Bharatanatyam
- Spouse: Chandra Dhandayudhapani Pillai
- Children: Dr. Uma Anand and me
- Awards: Padma Shri Natyakala Chakravarthy Kalaimamani Natyakalanidhi

Karaikal Natesa Dhandayudhapani Pillai (born 14 July 1921, Karaikal - 1974) was an Indian classical dancer and choreographer, considered by many as one of the leading exponents of the classical dance form of Bharatanatyam. He was also a teacher and trained multiple performers.

== Career ==
Born on 14 July 1921 in Karaikal in French India (nowadays the Indian union territory of Pondicherry), to A. K. Natesa Pillai, a known musician, he started training initially in music under his father, but later turned to Bharatanatyam and learned under his grandfather, who was a teacher of the dance form. Subsequently, he joined Kalakshetra of Rukmini Devi Arundale as a teacher where he taught for a number of years. He was known to have authored several compositions for Bharatanatyam and trained many students; Jaya Gowri (Malaysia), Sri Vidya, J. Jayalalithaa, Hema Rajagopalan, Suganthi Sadayane, Nayana Shenoy, Adyar K. Lakshman, Uma Muralikrishna, Vijayalakshmi Shetty-Ahuja, Jayalakshmi Alva and Geeta Chandran are some of the notable ones among them. He was the dance choreographer of a number of films in Telugu, Tamil and Hindi such as Raja Guruvu, Man-Mauji, Chhaya, Hum Panchhi Ek Daal Ke, Sri Kalahastiswara Mahatyam and Bhai-Bhai. He also founded Sri Rama Nataka Niketan, a dance academy in Chennai in 1967. The Government of India awarded him the fourth highest civilian honour of the Padma Shri, in 1971, for his contributions to dance.

== Personal life ==
His wife, Chandra Dhandayudhapani Pillai, is a known Bharatanatyam expert and teacher. Her younger sister Suria Santhanam also a noted Bharatanatyam teacher for 35 years.

== Death ==
He went to an eye operation in America. Following his return on 4 October, he attended his student's graduation ceremony. Later he had chest pain and was admitted to the hospital. On 12 October he died.

== See also ==
Sri Thandauthapanipillai was a famous bharathanatyam dancer as wells as a professional vocalist. He was born into a musical family. His grandfather was called Ramakrishnan, who was a great Bharathanaatyam artist.
