= Nartaki =

Nartaki (lit. 'female dancer') may refer to:

- Nartaki (1940 film), an Indian Hindi and Bengali film
- Nartaki (1963 film), an Indian social film

== See also ==
- Narthaki Nataraj, Indian Bharatanatyam dancer
- Narthaki.com, website for Indian classical dance
- Raj Nartaki, a 1941 Indian film
- Narthagi, a 2011 Indian film
