= Neila Sathyalingam =

Singaporean classical Indian dancer (1938–2017)

- நீலா சத்யலிங்கம்
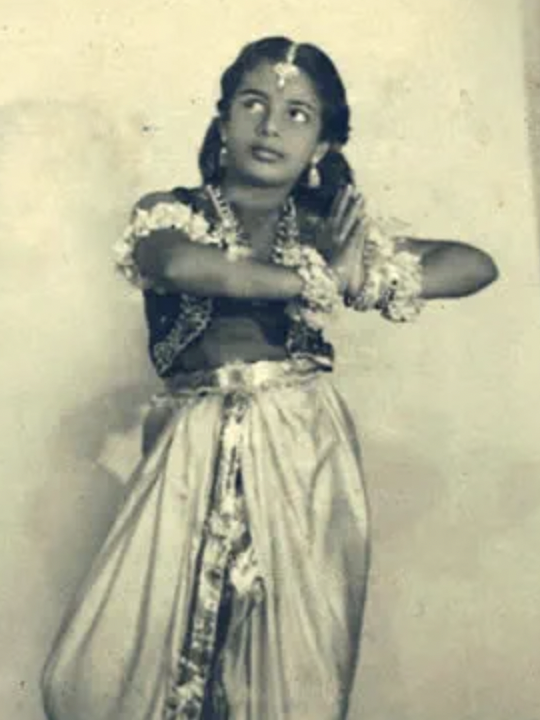
- Neila c. 1944
- Born: Neela Balendra; 8 February 1938; Colombo, Ceylon (now Sri Lanka)
- Died: 9 March 2017 (aged 79); Singapore
- Education: Kalakshetra (1956–1958, 1969–1971)
- Occupations: Classical Indian dancer, choreographer and instructor
- Known for: Receiving the Cultural Medallion for dance (1989)
- Title: Srimathi
- Spouse: Sathyalingam Suntharalingam
- Children: 5
- Website: www.apsarasarts.com

Neila Sathyalingam (8 February 1938 – 9 March 2017) was a Singaporean classical Indian dancer, choreographer and instructor of Sri Lankan Tamil origin. An alumna of Kalakshetra in Madras (now Chennai) under the tutelage of Srimathi Rukmini Devi Arundale, she emigrated with her family to Singapore in 1974. In 1977 she and her husband founded the performance arts company Apsaras Arts, which has staged performances throughout the world. She was the company's artistic director and continued to teach dance.

In 1983, Neila was appointed the dance instructor and choreographer for the Indian Dance Group of the People's Association (PA)—a state board in Singapore—where she remained a resident choreographer. She was also an artistic adviser to Singapore's National Arts Council. For her contributions to dance, Neila was awarded the Singaporean Cultural Medallion in 1989. She became a Singapore citizen in 1994.

Neila's interactions with choreographers and dancers of different cultural backgrounds and traditions in Singapore inspired her to create new Indian dance steps based on classical foundations; for instance, her dance-drama Kannagi, staged for the Singapore Festival of Arts in 1998, was said to have stretched tradition to its limits and offered something to a range of audiences far wider than a traditional dance-drama would have done. Up to 2007, Neila had choreographed dance segments for the last 13 Chingay Parades, street parades held annually in Singapore as part of Chinese New Year festivities.

== Early life and education ==
The second of four daughters of a well-to-do dental surgeon and a housewife, Neila Balendra was born in 1938 in Colombo, Ceylon (now Sri Lanka). She began dancing at the age of five, and trained in the classical Indian dance traditions of Bharatanatyam, Kathak, Kathakali and Manipuri at the Shanti Kumar School of Dance and the Kalaya School of Dance in Colombo. In 1954, she won the gold medal at the All-Ceylon Dance Festival and was selected to perform for Elizabeth II when the Queen visited Sri Lanka in April 1954 during her tour of the Commonwealth after acceding to the throne. Neila has said: "That was the day I decided I was going to devote my life to dance. My father wanted me to become a dental surgeon, but I refused".

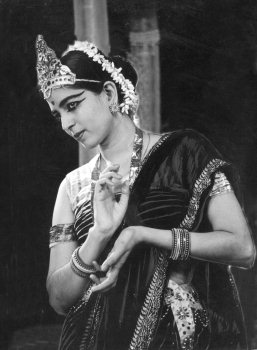
Neila Sathyalingam trained under the legendary Bharatanatyam danseuse Rukmini Devi Arundale, photographed here in 1940.

At 18, she enrolled in Kalakshetra, a cultural academy located in Madras (now Chennai) which was established to preserve traditional values in Indian art and reputed to be one of the best dance institutions in India, under the tutelage of Srimathi Rukmini Devi Arundale (1904–1986). She lived a regimented lifestyle, living in a thatched house with "snakes above and rats running below" and waking at 4:30am for dance practice every day. She completed her five-year course in two years, graduating with a first-class honours diploma in Bharatanatyam in 1957.

Neila met her husband, Sathyalingam Suntharalingam, at Kalakshetra. The son of a Sri Lankan politician, C. Suntharalingam, he had graduated from the University of Madras with a Sangitha Sironmani (Degree in Music) and from Kalakshetra in 1955 with a Diploma in Music, and was then teaching Indian classical music theory and the playing of the Indian drum and cymbals at the academy. After a two-year courtship, they married in 1956 and moved back to Sri Lanka where they lived in a 40-ha farm just outside Colombo. Sathyalingam then taught dance in schools while raising her children, the first of whom was born in 1957.

In May 1958, riots broke out in Sri Lanka between the Sinhalese and Tamil communities. Although the Sathyalingams received a tip-off that they had been targeted and managed to escape the violence, 80 Sinhalese rioters attacked and burned their home. Having lost their abode and all their possessions, they resettled in Colombo. In 1969 Neila returned to Kalakshetra to be trained as an instructor and to take up a postgraduate diploma course. She graduated in 1972 with a distinction and was appointed a dance teacher with Kalakshetra.

== Career in Singapore ==
In 1974, Neila moved to Singapore after American company Uniroyal Chemicals, for which her husband worked as an area sales manager, was posted there.

In Singapore, Neila was exposed to dancers of different cultural backgrounds and traditions, inspiring her to create new Indian dance steps based on classical foundations. In 1977, Neila and her husband founded performing arts company Apsaras Arts under the auspices of the Kamala Club, an organisation for Indian ladies promoting Indian dance and music. Starting with 20 students, the company expanded in size and significance, and has staged numerous arangetrams (dance débuts) and performances in Singapore and abroad, including Australia, Indonesia and Vietnam.

Apsaras Arts, now based at the Telok Ayer Performing Arts Centre, took part in numerous arts and dance festivals worldwide, including the Asean Festival in Malaysia (1983); the Australian Youth Musical Festival (August 1983); the Hong Kong Arts Festival (1990); the World of Music, Arts and Dance (Womad) Festival in Singapore (2002); the 17th National Cultural Festival in Nong Khai, Thailand (2003); and the Indian Festival of Arts in Singapore (2003). Neila and her husband were respectively the company's artistic director and music director, and continued to teach classical Indian dance and music.

In 1983, Neila was appointed the dance instructor and choreographer for the Indian Dance Group of the People's Association (PA), where she taught Indian dance to children from lower-income families for free. She was the resident choreographer for the Indian Dance Group, which is now under the umbrella of PA Talents. She was also an artistic adviser to the National Arts Council.

Neila was awarded the Cultural Medallion for her contributions to dance in 1989. She became a Singapore citizen in 1994, her husband and children following suit in subsequent years. Also in 1994, she was honoured by Bharat Kalachar, a music and dance school in Chennai, with the Viswa Kala Bharathi, an award given to non-resident Indian artistes who have helped to propagate Indian arts in foreign lands, for her artistic contributions throughout the world.

Together with fellow Cultural Medallion holders Som Said and Yang Choong Lian, Neila was a choreographer for the Lion City Angels, a multiracial children's dance troupe formed in 1988. The group performed in the Children's Folklore Festival in France in 1995 and the International Children's Folklore Festival in Spain in 1996. Other major achievements of Neila's include the dance-drama Kannagi, staged for the Singapore Festival of Arts in 1998, and the "Fire" segment of the performance The Rhythm of Life staged by the People's Association Cultural Troupe in November 2001; the former was said to have "stretched the bounds of traditions to its limits and succeeded in offering something to a range of audiences far wider than what a traditional dance-drama would have done". Up to 2007, Neila had also choreographed dance segments for the last 13 Chingay Parades, which are street parades held annually in Singapore as part of Chinese New Year festivities.

On 14 and 15 September 2007, Neila staged at the Victoria Theatre what has been termed her "last mega-production", an Indian epic dance drama called Sivagami written by Kalki Krishnamurthy (1899–1954), which involved 65 dancers from Apsaras Arts and from India. Thereafter, she has said that she intended to "slow down" by focusing on her teaching, although she has remarked: "There is really no such thing called a swan song, and I won't like to keep still after being so active. ... I will keep dancing as long as my body will say yes to me".

== Personal life ==
Neila and her husband, Sathyalingam, had three daughters and a son. Of her daughters, her eldest, Mohana (born 1957), sings for Apsaras Arts' performances; while Nandana (born 1960), runs an Indian performing arts school also called Apsaras Arts in Canberra, Australia. Her daughter, Shaan (born 1962) is a legal adviser for the National Library Board of Singapore. Her younger son Skanda (born 1963) contracted encephalitis at six months and became severely mentally and physically disabled. Neila's younger sister, Anusha, who lives in Zambia, is a Bharatanatyam dancer and teacher. She died, aged 79, on 9 March 2017.
