= Hema Rajagopalan =

Hema Rajagopalan is a Bharatanatyam dancer, teacher and choreographer from New Delhi, India.

Hema Rajagopalan started dancing in 1956 at the age of six under the instruction of her devadasi guru, Swarna Saraswathy. She performed her first arangetram after just six months of training, and was then hailed a child prodigy in the art of bharatanatyam. Later on in her career, she also studied bharatanatyam under Padmasri K.N. Dandayudapani Pillai and his brothers K.N. Pakkiriswami Pillai and K.N. Dakshinamoorthy Pillai. Most recently, she studied under Padma Kalanidhi Narayanan.

Rajagopalan moved to Chicago, Illinois in 1974 where she began doing smaller performances for friends to introduce Indian and Hindu culture beyond the small pockets of Indian immigrant communities. She then founded the Natya Dance Theatre to preserve and promote Bharatanatyam in the United States. Natya Dance Theatre performs contemporary interpretations of traditional dances through facial expressions, rhythmic footwork, dynamic body movement, and hand gestures through Abhinaya.

In 2001, Rajagopalan curated In the Diaspora: Spiritual, Classical, Contemporary, the first Bharatanatyam dance conference in the United States in a partnership with the Chicago Department of Cultural Affairs and Columbia College Chicago. In 2006, they partnered again to curate Dance India, the second U.S. Bharatanatyam dance conference.

She is the recipient of awards from the Asian American Heritage Council, the City of Chicago, and was the first Indian classical choreographer to be chosen by the Chicago Dancemakers Forum to create new work. She was also given the Vishwa Kala Bharathi Award for Artistic Excellence, given to only one artist per year.

Rajagopalan has been awarded grants from the National Endowment for the Arts and the Illinois Arts Council and has served as a panelist for both organizations. Most notably, Natya Dance Theatre was awarded a $50,000 grant from the McArthur Foundation in 2018.

Rajagopalan is currently the artistic director of Natya Dance Theatre in Chicago, with her daughter Krithika Rajagopalan serving as the Co-Artistic Director. She also conducts masterclasses at universities across the country.
