= Nirmala Ramachandran =

Indian dancer (1936–2011)

- Born: Nirmala Viswanathan; 9 February 1936; Mylapore, British India
- Died: 23 February 2011 (aged 75); Chennai, Tamil Nadu
- Occupations: Bharatanatyam dancer, dance teacher
- Spouse: S. Ramachandran
- Children: 2
- Parents: Viswanathan (father); Sivakamu (mother)
- Awards: Sangeet Natak Akademi Award (2004)

Nirmala Ramachandran is a Bharathanatyam dancer from Mylapore, Tamil Nadu. In 2004, she received the Sangeet Natak Akademi Award from the Sangeet Natak Akademi, Government of India, for her contributions in the field of Bharatanatyam.

== Biography ==
Nirmala Viswanathan was born on 9 February 1936 in Mylapore, Tamil Nadu. Nirmala's father Vishwanathan, a businessman, was a descended of the Needamangalam in Thanjavur district. Her mother, Sivakamu, was a lover of music and dance. Sivakamu's connection with dancer Mylapore Gowri Ammal, who was a regular visitor to their home in Mylapore and later Egmore, brought her closer to Carnatic music and Bharatanatyam. Nirmala came to be known as Nirmala Ramachandran after she married Ramachandran, an Air India officer posted abroad.

Nirmala received her initial Bharatanatyam training under Mylapore Gowri Ammal and Pandanallur Chokkalingam Pillai. She had her arangettam (first public stage performance) in 1947, when she was 11 years. She continued her studies and trained under T. Jayamma and T. Murthamma of the Dhanammal school between 1955 and 1963.

Nirmala, who was also interested in Carnatic music, did her Bachelor of Arts in Carnatic music from the Queen Mary's College in Chennai under University of Madras, in 1956, and did her advanced training under K. V. Narayanaswamy and T. Muktha.

=== Personal life and death ===
In 1958 she married S. Ramachandran, an Air India officer. The couple have two sons, Dr. Ram Gopalakrishnan and Siddhartha Ramachandran. She died on 23 February 2011, at Chennai, Tamil Nadu.

== Career ==
Nirmala got the opportunity to participate in a dance program by the famous dancer Balasaraswati, but neither Sarangapani Iyengar nor her guru Chokkalingam Pillai were in favor of it. This later led to a rift with Chokkalingam Pillai and his Panthanallur dance style. It was E. Krishna Iyer who facilitated his return to the Panthanallur dance style by providing him with the opportunity to study dance under Thiruvalaputhur Swaminath Pillai. She performed a full length concert once at the Madras Music Academy on 28 December 1954.

Nirmala, who had to live in various countries with her husband Ramachandran, continued her artistic career and spread the art of Bharatanatyam in those countries as well through her performances, lectures, and classes. She had performed in various venues worldwide including the India festival in the Soviet Union in 1987-88.

Nirmala Ramachandran, who is also a Bharatanatyam teacher, has trained many dancers at her institution, Nirmala Niketan.

== Awards and honors ==
In 2001 Nirmala received Certificate of Merit award from the Madras Music Academy. In 2004, she received the Sangeet Natak Akademi Award for Bharatanatyam.
