= Anjali Mehr =

Indian classical dancer

Anjali Mehr (née Hora; 1928-1978) was an Indian classical dancer (Bharatnatyam), choreographer and educator. "Anjaliben", as she was called was known for her bold experiments and innovations in Bharatnatyam. As one of the earliest disciples of the legendary Rukmini Devi, and among the first students of the Kalakshetra, she played a vital role in building and strengthening dance-education in India. She was the first Principal of the Bhartiya Vidya Bhavan's Sangeet Nartan Shikshapeeth. In 1951, she became one of the two people to be featured from India in Magnum Photos' global project 'Generation X'. Anjali Mehr is counted amongst the first few post-Independence dance scholars of India.

== Early life and education ==
Anjali was born in 1928 to Rameshbhai and Mugdhaben Hora and was their only daughter. She started learning Kathak at the age of four, but when her parents became acquainted with the Theosophical Society, she started to train in Bharatnatyam at Kalakshetra. Here, she had the opportunity to learn from the greatest Bharatnatyam teachers - Guru Meenakshisundaram Pillai, Chokkalingam Pillai, Sharadambai Devadasi and Dandayudhapani Pillai.

== Career ==
In 1947, she was invited by Kulapati Dr. K. M. Munshi, founder of the Bhavan teach Dance at the Bhartiya Vidya Bhavan.

For sometime she ran a school "Rukmini Kala Vihar" named after her Guru Rukmini Devi. After her marriage with Dr. Sukumar Merh, Professor and Head of Department of Geology, M. S. University at Baroda, Anjali settled in Gujarat.

In the 1950s, when the Faculty of Performing Arts (Dance Department) was established at the M.S University, Baroda, Mohan Khokar, another alumni of Kalakshetra, stepped in as the Head of Department. Anjali first joined as a Visiting Professor and later succeeded him as the Head of Department. Here she played a vital role in developing dance pedagogy. She developed an easier learning system for non-Tamil speaking students through her "Stick Drawing Notation System" in the mid-1960s.

She became known for establishing the Gujarati school of Bharatnatyam through her compositions and dance-dramas. In 1972, she wrote a margam (a formal dance format in Bharatnatyam) in Gujarati. In 1977, In 1977, Anjali wrote, composed and choreographed the Chandramoulishwara Kuravanji in Gujarati. It is considered to be the first ever Kuravanji (a kind of dance-drama) written in Gujarati. Anjali even composed the music for this Kuravanji in praise of the presiding deity of Somnath in Saurashtra. In doing so, she followed the example of Kutrala Kuravanji in which she danced as a Sakhi with Rukmini Devi.

Anjali was well-versed with Hindustani and Carnatic music and used regional languages (Gujarati, Marathi, Hindi, Assamese) as well as Sanskrit to create compositions which made Bharatnatyam popular in non-Tamil speaking areas. She is also known to have sung for the AIR.

== Works ==
She authored two books in Gujarati : Nartanadarśikā (on Bharatanatyam) and Chandramaulishwara Kuruvanji with Astha Nayika. She also wrote many songs in Gujarati.
