= Mylapore Gowri Ammal =

Indian dancer (1892–1971)

- Born: Gowri Ammal; 1892; Mylapore, British India
- Died: 22 January 1971 (aged 78–79); Chennai, Tamil Nadu
- Other name: Mylapore Gowri Amma
- Occupation: Bharatanatyam dancer
- Awards: Sangeet Natak Akademi Award (1959)

Mylapore Gowri Ammal also known as Mylapore Gowri Amma (1892–1971) was a Bharathanatyam dancer from Mylapore India. She was a temple dancer at Kapaleeshwarar Temple in Mylapore. In 1959, she received the Sangeet Natak Akademi Award for Bharathanatyam.

== Biography ==
Mylapore Gowri Ammal was born in 1892, in a Devadasi family of Mylapore, Tamil Nadu. Her mother Doraikannu Ammal was also a dancer. She learned dance from Nelluru Munuswamy Nattuvanar and from her mother. Born into a family of temple dancers, she was the last person to serve at the Kapaleeshwarar Temple in Mylapore. She lived in a small house given to her by the temple, until a law was passed banning temple dancing. Having lost her guardianship and home, she survived the rest of her life by teaching dance.

She died on 22 January 1971.

== Career ==
Gowri Ammal started her dancing career as a temple dancer in Kapaleeshwarar Temple in Mylapore. Ammal is often referred to as the last devadasi of Kapaleeshwarar Temple. She danced for the deity in the temple until the Indian government banned the Devadasi system in 1947, under the Madras Devadasis (Prevention of Dedication) Act.

As part of E. Krishna Iyer's efforts to support Bharatanatyam and have it recognised as an art form, and not dismiss it as part of a social reform movement, since it was based on the Devadasi system, in 1932, Gauri Ammal danced at the Madras Music Academy. Ammal gained fame in 1936 when Rukmini Devi Arundale, her first student, approached her to become her Bharatanatyam guru. Rukmini had come to the Kapaleeshwarar temple to ask her to come to the Kalakshetra, to teach her the subtleties of "abhinaya" (acting).

Gauri Ammal's abhinaya (acting), bhava (face expression) and musical talent in the Bharatanatyam performance were widely noted. She last performed on a public stage at the Silver Jubilee celebrations of the Indian National Congress in 1935.

== Notable disciples ==
Many notable dancers, including Balasaraswati, Rukmini Devi Arundale, Sudharani Raghupathy, Kalanidhi Narayanan, Sonal Mansingh, Yamini Krishnamurthy and Nirmala Ramachandran were students of Gauri Ammal.

== Awards and honors ==
She received the Sangeet Natak Akademi Award for Bharathanatyam in 1959. She also received award from Madras Music Academy.
