= Vilasini (name) =

Vilasini is the pen name of writer M. K. Menon (1928–1993). Other notable people with the name include:

- Kalakshetra Vilasini (born 1940), Indian dancer
- Kuttyedathi Vilasini (fl. 1971–present), Indian actress
- Vilasini Menon (fl. 1951–1952), Singaporean politician
