= Dhananjayans =

Indian dancers

V. P. Dhananjayan & Shanta Dhananjayan
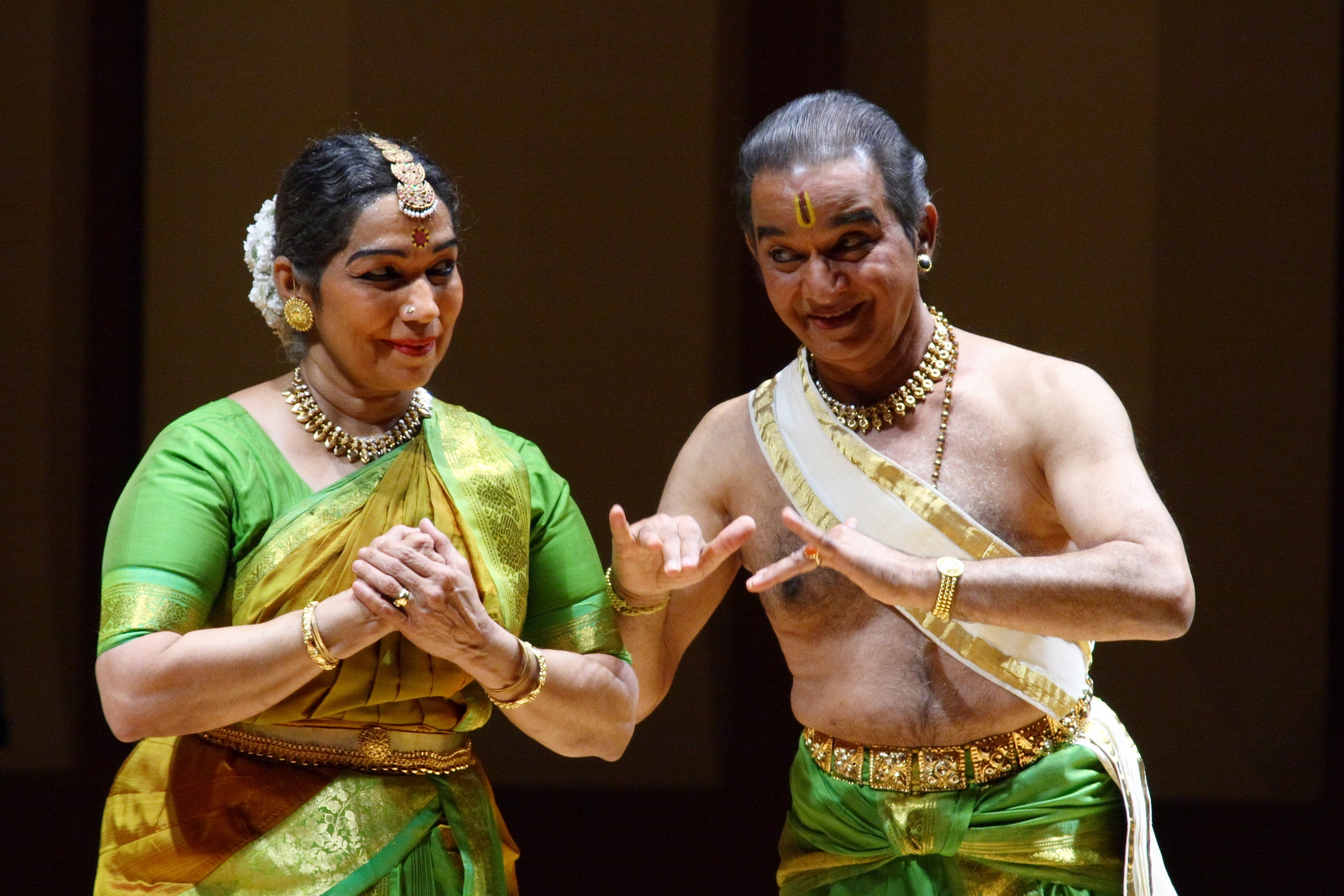
- The Dhananjayans performing at a concert in 2009
- Born: Vannadil Pudiyaveettil Dhananjayan, Shantha Dhananjayan; 30 April 1939 (age 87); 12 August 1943 (age 83); Payyanur, Kerala, India
- Education: B.A. in Economics and Political Science (V.P. Dhananjayan) Post Graduate diploma in Bharatnatyam (Shanta Dhananjayan)
- Website: bharatakalaanjali.org

Vannadil Pudiyaveettil Dhananjayan (born 30 April 1939) and Shanta Dhananjayan (born 12 August 1943), collectively known as the Dhananjayans, are an Indian dance duo specializing in Bharatanatyam and Kathakali.

== Personal life ==
V.P Dhananjayan was born into a Malayali family of eight children on 30 April 1939 in Payyanur, Kannur District, Kerala, India. A chance encounter with Kathakali Master Guru Chandu Panicker of Kalakshetra made his father decide to send his son and V. Balagopalan to Kalakshetra under his tutelage. Dhananjayan joined Kalakshetra on 5 October 1953 and trained as a male dancer under Rukmini Devi Arundale (founder of Kalakshetra) from 1955 to 1967. He graduated from Kalakshetra with a Postgraduate Diploma in Dance (Bharatanatyam and Kathakali) with distinction. Additionally, he holds a B.A. degree in Economics and Politics.

Shanta Dhananjayan was born on 12 August 1943 into a Malayali family in Malaysia and traces her ancestral roots to Kerala, from where her family migrated to Malaysia. In June 1952, at the age of eight, she was sent to Kalakshetra, where she later graduated with a Postgraduate Diploma in Bharatanatyam with distinction and also trained in Kathakali and Carnatic music. She was a prominent female dancer at Kalakshetra from 1955 to 1968.

The couple has two sons. The elder, Sanjay, lives in the United States, and the younger, Satyajit, lives with his wife and son in Chennai, India, and is a dancer, choreographer, dance instructor, and automobile photographer.

=== In Kalakshetra ===
Dhananjayan received a scholarship at Kalakshetra to study Bharatanatyam, Kathakali, Mridangam and music. Shanta trained in Bharatanatyam and music, in addition to other subjects for nearly a decade. They have said that whatever they have been able to achieve is due to the mentoring of their Gurus Rukmini Devi Arundale and Chandu Panicker as well as various other faculty members of Kalakshetra such as NS Jayalakshmi and Sarada Hoffman.

Shanta was the first girl he met as he was being escorted into the portals of Kalakshetra by Guru Panicker. Though Shanta was a student completely devoted to her dance and music, she had secretly made up her mind, at the age of twelve, to partner Dhananjayan in life. Dhananjayan expressed his desire to marry Shanta when she was eighteen years old, but she left for Malaysia after graduation and did not let him know of her consent until after returning to India four years later. They married in 1966 at the Guruvayoor Temple in Kerala.

== Career ==
The Dhananjayans left Kalakshetra in the late 1960s to build a career on their own.

Their performances and productions include:

- Pandit Ravi Shankar's Magnum Opus "GHANASHYAM" 1989/90
- National Dance Institute, New York "CHAKRA", with a cast of 1,000 multinational children
- A joint venture of Ohio Ballet Co., Cuyahoga Community College, and Cleveland Cultural Alliance– Jungle Book Ballet
- Choreographer for International Art Festival of Government of Singapore, "Sita Rama Katha" 1986 in the same festival, choreographed dance drama "Sanghamitra" with Singapore Artistes 1994
- Mahaabhaaratham dance drama jointly produced by French Theatre Fluerry & Association Vaani in Reunion French Island 1998, 1999

=== Bharata Kalanjali ===
The Dhananjayans registered their own dance school Bharata Kalanjali in 1971 in Adyar, Chennai. It is still active today with the classes recently shifted to Taramani, their current school at The Spastics Society of Tamil Nadu.

=== Bhaaskara ===
The couple has established an academy of arts at Dhananjayan's birthplace Payyanur in Kerala. They conducted an annual summer Naatya Gurukulam camp, which is no longer in operation.

=== Yogaville ===
The Dhananjayans have been conducting an annual summer gurukulam camp at the Satchidananda Ashram, Yogaville in Buckingham County, Virginia, USA, since 1988. Developed by the Natya Adyayana Gurukulam, the camp is an intensive, full-time residential course devoted entirely to the fine arts. Situated in the Virginia countryside, it is attended by Indian-American and international students.

== Honours ==
Some of the awards and accolades conferred on the Dhananjayans include:

- 1995: Kerala Sangeetha Nataka Akademi Fellowship.
- 2009: Padma Bhushan, Government of India.
- 2015: Guruvandam
- 2022: Natya Selvam Award.

=== Individual honours ===
- 1990: V.P.Dhananjayan - Received title of Kalaimamani Award by the Government of Tamil Nadu, which is the highest state honour in the field of Arts.
- 1995: Shanta Dhananjayan - Received title of Kalaimamani Award by the Government of Tamil Nadu, which is the highest state honour in the field of Arts.

== Social issues and politics ==
Dhananjayan's publication, Beyond Performing Art and Culture, discusses various social and political issues concerning present-day India or Bhaaratam, the way he urges everyone to call the country.

== Films ==
V. P. Dhananjayan played a role in Gautham Menon's 2023 film Dhruva Natchathiram: Chapter One – Yuddha Kaandam, while Shanta played a martial arts guru in the 2024 Malayalam period film Malaikottai Vaaliban.

== Publications ==
V. P Dhananjayan has published:

- Beyond Performing Art and Culture: Politico-Socio Aspects, V.P. Dhananjayan. New Delhi, B.R. Rhythms, 2007, xviii, 314 p., ills, ISBN 81-88827-08-8.
- Dhananjayan on Indian Classical Dance, V.P. Dhananjayan, B.R. Rhythms, 2004, 3rd revised edition, ISBN 81-88827-04-5
