= Kalanidhi Narayanan =

Indian dancer (1928-2016)

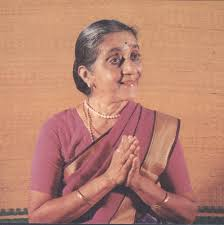
- Narayanan in 1986
- Born: Kalanidhi Ganapathi; 7 December 1928; Tamil Nadu, British India
- Died: 21 February 2016 (aged 87); Chennai, India
- Occupations: Indian classical dancer, dance teacher
- Years active: 1940-1944; 1973-2016
- Dancing career
- Current group: Madras Music Academy
- Dances: Bharatnatyam

Kalanidhi Narayanan (7 December 1928) was an Indian dancer and teacher of the Indian classical dance form of Bharatnatyam. She was an early non-devadasi girl to learn the dance form and perform it on stage in the 1930s and 1940s. After a brief career in the 1940s, she returned to dance in 1973 and became a notable teacher of abhinaya.

She was awarded the Padma Bhushan, India's third highest civilian honour in 1985, the Sangeet Natak Akademi Award for Bharatnatyam in 1990, given by Sangeet Natak Akademi, India's National Academy for Music, Dance and Drama and Kalidas Samman (1998). She was also conferred Sangeet Natak Akademi Tagore Ratna for Dance in 2011.

== Early life and training ==
Born Kalanidhi Ganapathi in the Brahmin household of Sumitra and Ganapati, her mother was keen on getting her dance education, and this was supported by her father. Thus starting at the age of seven she trained intensively under various gurus, including Kamakshi Ammal, daughter of Veena Dhanam, for Padams and Javalis and Manakkal Sivarajan for vocal lessons. Noted guru Kannappa Pillai, from Kanchipuram was her main teacher of nritta (dance). He also trained Balasaraswati, while Chinnayya Naidu and Mylapore Gowri Ammal taught her Abhinaya (art of expression). Later she was to add a new dimension to abhinaya herself.

She made her stage-debut (Arangetram) at the age of 12 at the Senate House in Chennai, for the Madras Music Academy. While still in her teens, she gave two notable recitals, one with Dhanamanikkam and another with Nattuvanar K. Ganesan, son of the Kandappa Pillai.

She died in February 2016.

== Career ==
She had a brief dance career in the 1940s, before she discontinued it at the age of sixteen when her mother died and she was married into a conservative family. She returned to dance in 1973, when noted art-patron Y. G. Doraiswamy, who had seen her performances as a teen, asked to instruct dancer Alarmel Valli in abhinaya, to which she agreed, encouraged by her sons who had by now grown up. This started the second phase of her career after a gap of 30 years at the age of 46. She also started to re-educate herself in dance. Her books from her younger days had survived, and she started attending dance performances and Arangetram in the city, and also enrolled in a course on dance theory on Bharatanatyam by Dr. Padma Subramaniam. Gradually, more students started coming to her and in the coming decades she became "the most sought after teacher for abhinaya".

On 7 December 2003, various dance teachers and her disciples, celebrated her 75th birthday at Luz Community Hall in Chennai, it was marked by a two-day seminar on abhinaya, where prominent gurus of Bharatanatyam participated. On the occasion, a set of 4 CDs on Padams was also released.

== Disciples ==
Amongst her noted disciples are, Ramya Harishankar (USA), A.Lakshmanaswamy (India), Bragha Bessell (India), Hema Rajagopalan (India), Madhusri Sethuraman (USA), Subashree Narayanan (USA), Minal Prabhu (India), Priya Govind (India), Sharmila Biswas, Meenakshi Chitharanjan (abhinaya), Milana Severskaya (Russia) to name a few. She has taught numerous disciples over the years, many of whom have personalised her philosophies.
