= Kalakshetra Vilasini =

Indian Bharatanatyam dancer)

- Born: Vilasini Krishnapillai; 1939 (age 86–87)
- Spouse: Muralidharan Nair
- Children: 2
- Awards: Kerala Sangeetha Nataka Akademi Award

Kalakshetra Vilasini (born 1939) is an Indian Bharatanatyam dancer from Kerala. Vilasini, who won first place in Bharatanatyam at the Kerala University Youth Festival, is also the first person from Kerala to get admission to the Kalakshetra of renowned dancer Rukmini Devi Arundale. She is the recipient of Kerala Sangeetha Nataka Akademi Award in 1995.

== Life and career ==
Vilasini started practising Bharatanatyam at the age of 12. After gaining admission as a teacher at Tripunithura RLV Sangeetha Academy, she was the only artist selected by the Government of Kerala in 1958 to send to Kalakshetra in Chennai for training under Rukmini Devi Arundale. Vilasini started a dance school named Nrityasree at her home in Ernakulam to provide training in Bharatanatyam in Gurukula style. In 1995, she retired from RLV as the Head of the Department of Bharatanatyam. The same year, she was honoured with the Kerala Sangeetha Nataka Akademi Award.

In the year 2022, she was honoured with the Amrit award by Sangeet Natak Akademi for 7 decades of dedication to Bharatanatyam.
