= Francesca Arundale =

Francesca Arundale (born 1847 in Brighton, England; died 23 March 1924 in India) was an English theosophist and freemason.

== Career ==
She became a member of the Theosophical Society Adyar in 1881 and was a close friend of Helena Blavatsky and Annie Besant. In 1896 she became a member of Le Droit Humain. She also participated at Besant's foundation of the first London Lodge of "Le Droit Humain".

== Personal life ==
She also lived many years in Germany. In 1902 she moved to Adyar. Her adopted son, who was also her great-nephew, George Arundale, later became president of the Theosophical Society Adyar. In India she was especially active in the Varanasi branch of the T.S.

== Works ==
- Idea of Rebirth Including a Translation of an Essay on Re-incarnation. Kessinger Publishing, Whitefish 1998; ISBN 0-7661-0585-7
- My Guest, H.P. Blavatsky. Kessinger Publishing, Whitefish 2004; ISBN 0-7661-9125-7
