= Jaya Thyagarajan =

Indian artist

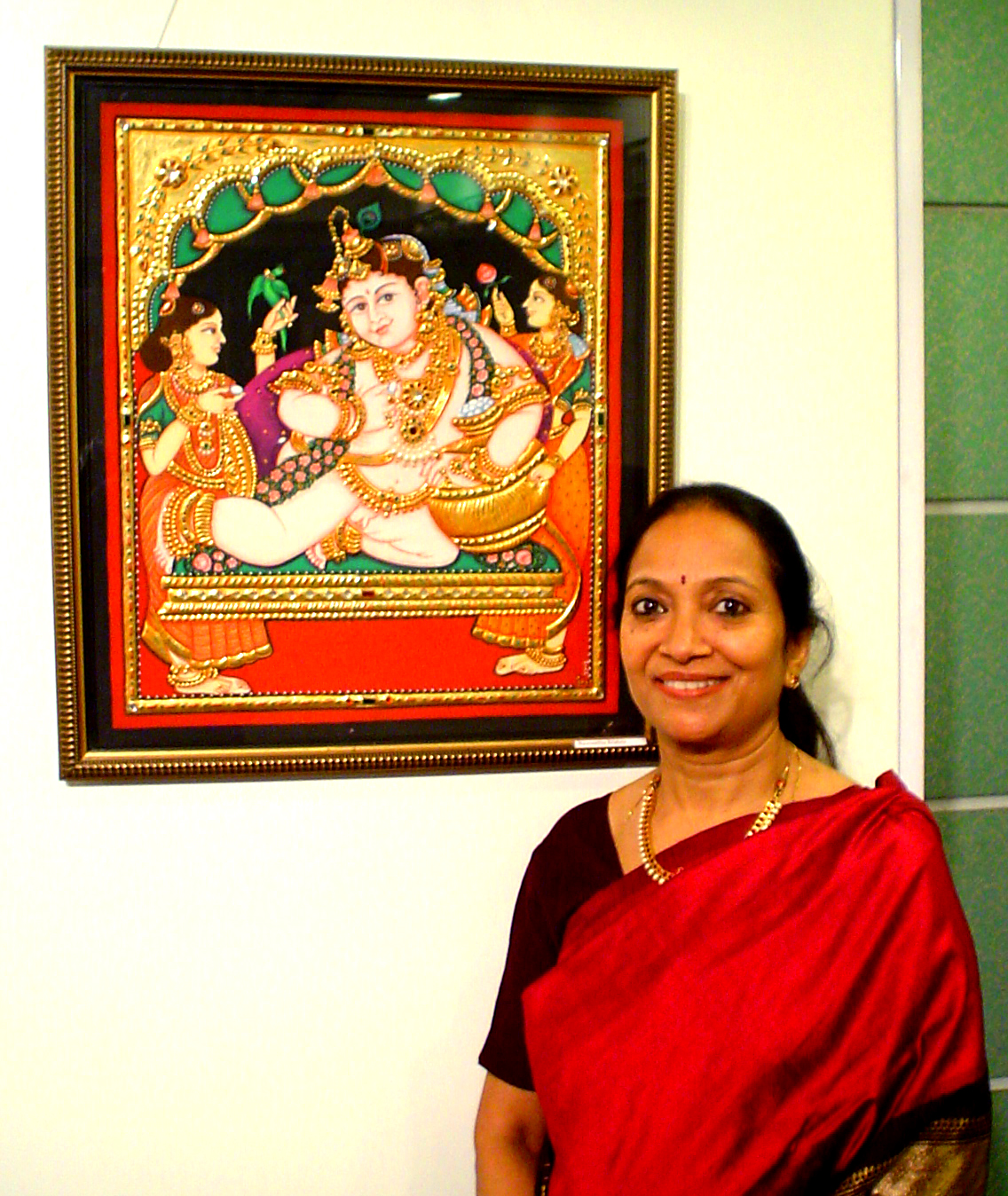
- Picture taken at exhibition held at ICCR, New Delhi between 18-26 Dec 2011
- Born: Jayalakshmi Krishnamurthy; 29 December 1956; Coimbatore, Tamil Nadu, India
- Style: Tanjore

Jaya Thyagarajan (born at Coimbatore, Tamil Nadu, India in 1956) is a traditional Indian artist noted for her Tanjore paintings. Jaya was born in Madras State where these paintings originated.

== Education ==
After getting her bachelor of Arts in History in 1976 and a master of Arts in Indian Philosophy in 1978, she obtained a diploma in Fine Arts from the Kalakshetra School of fine arts in Madras under the guidance of Shri K. Sreenivasulu, head of the Department.

Jaya is a follower of the Tanjore School of Paintings and her various exhibits are the reproductions of some of the old Tanjore masterpieces.

== Exhibitions ==
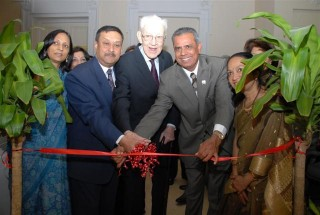
Jaya Thyagarajan (extreme right) with the Consul General Mr. Prabhu Dayal and Ambassador Philip Talbot at the launch of Asia Initiatives, New York, April 2009

Her first Exhibition was at Kalakshetra school in 1980 followed by one in 1981. She has held successful Solo Exhibitions at Max Muller Bhavan in 1982 and Triveni Art Gallery in New Delhi in May 1992 and August 1993. She was asked to participate in Kala-Mela organized by Lalit Kala Academy, New Delhi in 1986.

Jaya's paintings were selected for the Traditional Art exhibition held by the All India Fine arts and Crafts Society in 1989 and 2000. Her works have also been selected for exhibitions held by Poompuhar, Tamil Nadu Emporium, New Delhi in January and June 1992 and October 1993.

Jaya also had an exhibition of her works at Nehru Centre of the High Commission of India, London in October 1995, St. Denis Municipality, Reunion Island, Indira Gandhi Centre for Arts and Culture, Mauritius in April 1997 and ANZ Grindlays Bank, New Delhi in October 1997,1998. In 2002 Jaya conducted an exhibition of her works at the Indian Embassy, Washington DC. She also held an Exhibition of her paintings at Jawahar Kala Kendra, Jaipur in 2006.

Jaya also recently exhibited her work of Tanjore Paintings at The Consulate General of India, New York, in association with Asia Initiatives, at the launch of Asia Initiatives in USA.

Jaya's creations today are contained in many homes and Corporate Offices in India and other parts of the World.
