= Oral submucous fibrosis =

- Other names: OSMF or OSF
- Specialty: Oral medicine and Dentistry and Oral Pathology

Oral submucous fibrosis (OSF) is a chronic, complex, premalignant (1% transformation risk) condition of the oral cavity, characterized by juxta-epithelial inflammatory reaction and progressive fibrosis of the submucosal tissues (the lamina propria and deeper connective tissues). As the disease progresses, the oral mucosa becomes fibrotic to the point that the person is unable to open the mouth. The condition is remotely linked to oral cancers and is associated with the chewing of areca nut and/or its byproducts, commonly practiced in South and South-East Asian countries. The incidence of OSF has also increased in western countries due to changing habits and population migration.

== Definitions ==
- Per Jens J. Pindborg and Satyavati Sirsat (1966, pathological definition): 'An insidious chronic disease affecting any part of the oral cavity and sometimes the pharynx. Although occasionally preceded by and/or associated with vesicle formation, it is always associated with a juxta-epithelial inflammatory reaction followed by a fibro-elastic change of the lamina propria, with epithelial atrophy leading to stiffness.' Despite its shortcomings, this description, which describes the basic histology understanding of the illness, has been used consistently around the world for more than 50 years.
- Per Mohit Sharma and Raghu Radhakrishnan (2019): 'An insidious, chronic potentially malignant fibrotic disorder affecting the entire oral cavity and sometimes the pharynx and oesophagus. Although occasionally preceded by and/or associated with vesicle formation, it is always associated with a juxta-epithelial inflammatory reaction followed by a fibroelastic change of the lamina propria with epithelial atrophy leading to stiffness of the oral mucosa, progressive decrement in mouth opening and inability to eat'
- Per Chandramani More and Naman Rao (2019, clinical definition): 'A debilitating, progressive, irreversible collagen metabolic disorder induced by chronic chewing of areca nut and its commercial preparations; affecting the oral mucosa and occasionally the pharynx and esophagus; leading to mucosal stiffness and functional morbidity; and has a potential risk of malignant transformation.'
- Per Sharma et al., in 2024 redefined it OSF as "Areca nut-induced potentially malignant disorder of the oral mucosal tissues, pharynx, and esophagus characterized by fibrosis akin to an overhealing wound, leading to progressive reduction in mouth opening."

== Symptoms ==
In the initial phase of the disease, the mucosa feels leathery with palpable fibrotic bands. The oral mucosa loses resiliency in the advanced stage and becomes blanched and stiff. This blanched and stiff mucosa is considered to lead to a progressive reduction in mouth opening but seems to be an oversimplification of the pathology. The degree of mouth opening is also determined by the severity of oral symptoms, such as recurring or persistent glossitis and stomatitis, a fact that many researchers ignore. This phenomenon is explained by the term Reflectory Trismus, where the above symptoms dictate the degree of mouth opening through activation of the 5th and 9th cranial nerves. However, muscle damage and fibrosis play a larger contributory role. The condition is believed to begin in the posterior part of the oral cavity and gradually spread outward. The premise posterior to the anterior progression of oral submucous fibrosis has been recently rebutted based on several reports stating that the disease may be restricted to the anterior part of the oral cavity without involvement of posterior parts; the sites are dictated by the manner of use anterior areas of the oral cavity when spitting and posterior when swallowed.

Other features of the disease include:

- Xerostomia
- Recurrent ulceration
- Pain in the ear or deafness
- Nasal intonation of voice
- Restriction of the movement of the soft palate
- A budlike shrunken uvula
- Thinning and stiffening of the lips
- Pigmentation of the oral mucosa
- Dryness of the mouth and burning sensation (stomatopyrosis)
- Decreased tongue protrusion

== Cause ==
- Dried products such as paan masala and gutkha have higher concentrations of areca nut and appear to cause the disease.
- Areca nut is the definitive causative agent of OSF.
- A new term was introduced by Sharma et al., in 2024 "Areca Nut induced Oral Fibrosis (AIOF)" since fibrosis in the oral cavity can occur due to various causes and thus have varying malignant propensity. The reclassification of OSF as AIOF has significant implications for diagnosis and management. It emphasizes the primary causative agent and its role in developing the condition. This reclassification improves diagnosis, management, and patient education. Recognizing AIOF as a distinct entity also enhances understanding, enables researchers to explore prevention strategies, and equips policymakers to implement targeted public health campaigns.
- Fibrosis due to other causes has distinctive features and should be named according to cause and not called oral submucous fibrosis
  - Immunological diseases can occur in the background of graft vs Host Disease or as an oral manifestation of systemic sclerosis
  - Khat Induced Oral fibrosis
  - Oral fibrosis due to Iron defiency anemia
  - Tobacco-induced oral fibrosis

== Pathogenesis ==
"Exposure to areca nut (Areca catechu) containing products with or without tobacco (ANCP/T) is currently believed to lead to OSF in individuals with genetic immunologic or nutritional predisposition to the disease.". On the other hand, reduced CD1a+ Langerhans cells and CD207+ dendritic cells indicate evolving immunosuppression in OSF and its progression to OSCC.

This hypersensitivity reaction results in a juxta-epithelial inflammation that leads to increased fibroblastic activity and decreased breakdown of fibers. The fibroblasts are phenotypically modified, and the fibers they form are more stable, produce thicker bundles that progressively become less elastic. once the original loosely arranged fibrous tissue is replaced by the ongoing fibrosis, the movability of the oral tissues is reduced, there is loss of flexibility and reduced opening of the mouth. These collagen fibers are non-degradable, and the phagocytic activity is minimized. The role of pure capsaicin in the etiology and pathogenesis of oral submucous fibrosis has been debunked, as it has been shown to have antifibrotic and anticancer effects. Mosqueda-Solís in their Systematic review have shown anticancer activity of capsaicin on oral cancer. It has been shown by computational biology, capsaicin hinders the collagen fibre formation. Moreover, capsaicin has been shown to cause the degradation of collagen I by activation of MMP1 through TRPV1 channels.

According to a 2015 cross-sectional study, the time taken for return of salivary pH to baseline levels after chewing areca-nut-containing mixtures is significantly longer in habitual users with OSF when compared to unaffected users. Prolonged alkaline pH induces death of the fetal fibroblast type and replacement by a profibrotic fibroblast. The patterns of intraoral fibrotic bands produced by alkaline chemical injury mimic those produced by areca nut chewing.

Sharma et al. in 2018 first proposed the over-healing wound model of OSF to explain its evolution as well as its malignant transformation. Given that OSF is an over-healing wound, Choudhari et al. have recently implicated factor XIIIa (the last factor in the coagulation pathway) in playing a critical role in the development of fibrosis in OSF and found a strong correlation between factor XIIIa and increasing grades of OSF in their study. Incidentally, Sharma et al. in 2018 had already proposed an important role of factor XIIIa in the pathogenesis of OSF, by promoting the generation of fibrin degradation products (FDP). Literature is replete with patients with OSF having FDPs in their blood, and this can be considered as proof for the role of factor XIIIa in the pathogenesis of OSF, and also of it being an overhealing wound.

OSF exhibits a biphasic stem-cell disorder, characterised by the loss of basal stemness during fibrosis, followed by pathological reactivation during malignant transformation. Oral mucosal stem-cell markers (OM-SCMs)—keratins 5/14/19, CD44, β1-integrin, p63, SOX2, Oct-4, c-MYC, Bmi-1, ALDH1—are essential for epithelial renewal. Their coordinated downregulation in OSF produces a depleted, senescent basal layer, resulting in the characteristic epithelial atrophy. Their coordinated downregulation in OSF results in a depleted, senescent basal layer, leading to the characteristic epithelial atrophy. Sharma et al. (2020) provided the first coherent, mechanistic argument that this atrophy arises from stem cell loss driven by basal-layer senescence. The same model explains progression: when a subset of these senescent cells escapes arrest and reactivates OM-SCM pathways, stemness is aberrantly restored, generating a hyperplastic, transformation-prone epithelium. The lesion therefore oscillates between stem-cell failure in the fibrotic phase and stem-cell reactivation in the dysplastic–malignant phase, with both states rooted in disturbed basal-cell biology rather than surface-level epithelial changes.

The role of senescence in the pathogenesis of oral submucous fibrosis has been supported by further research. Increased mechanical stiffness through the YAP/TAZ pathway accelerates the malignant transformation of OSF, by allowing senescence escape. Sharma et al. (2024) proposed a refined pathogenic framework in which myofibroblasts endure in OSF by establishing an immune-privileged niche. They identified the specific apoptosis-resistance mechanisms—metabolic, cytokine-mediated, and receptor-level—that allow these cells to evade clearance and sustain fibrotic activity. This was the first systematic explanation of how myofibroblast survive by acquiring apoptosis resistance phenotype, rather than repeated activation alone, drives lesion persistence and progression.

== Diagnosis ==
=== Classification ===
Oral submucous fibrosis is clinically divided into three stages:

- Stage 1: Stomatitis
- Stage 2: Fibrosis
  - a. Early lesions, blanching of the oral mucosa
  - b. Older lesions, vertical and circular palpable fibrous bands in and around the mouth or lips, resulting in a mottled, marble-like appearance of the buccal mucosa
- Stage 3: Sequelae of oral submucous fibrosis
  - a. Leukoplakia
  - b. Speech and hearing deficits

Khanna and Andrade in 1995 developed a group classification system for the surgical management of trismus:

- Group I: Earliest stage without mouth opening limitations with an interincisal distance of greater than 35 mm.
- Group II: Patients with an interincisal distance of 26–35 mm.
- Group III: Moderately advanced cases with an interincisal distance of 15–26 mm. Fibrotic bands are visible at the soft palate, and pterygomandibular raphe and anterior pillars of fauces are present.
- Group IVA: Trismus is severe, with an interincisal distance of less than 15 mm and extensive fibrosis of all the oral mucosa.
- Group IVB: Disease is most advanced, with premalignant and malignant changes throughout the mucosa. Tumor necrosis factor alpha and keratin 17 are interdependent regulators; they could be used as diagnostic markers and a prognostic mirror of oral submucous fibrosis cases

== Treatment ==
Biopsy screening, although necessary, is not mandatory; most dentists can visually examine the area and proceed with the proper course of treatment.

Treatment includes:

- Abstention from chewing areca nut (also known as betel nut) and tobacco
- Minimizing consumption of spicy foods, including chiles
- Maintaining proper oral hygiene
- Supplementing the diet with foods rich in vitamins A, B complex, and C and iron
- Forgoing hot fluids like tea, coffee
- Forgoing alcohol
- Employing a dental surgeon to round off sharp teeth and extract third molars
- Interprofessional treatment approach

Treatment also includes following:

- The prescription of chewable pellets of hydrocortisone (Efcorlin); one pellet to be chewed every three to four hours for three to four weeks
- 0.5 ml intralesional injection Hyaluronidase 1500 IU mixed in 1 ml of Lignocaine into each buccal mucosa once a week for 4 weeks or more as per condition
- 0.5 ml intralesional injection of Hyaluronidase 1500 IU and 0.5 ml of injection Hydrocortisone acetate 25 mg/ml in each buccal mucosa once a week alternatively for 4 weeks or more as per condition
- Submucosal injections of hydrocortisone 100 mg once or twice daily depending upon the severity of the disease for two to three weeks
- Submucosal injections of human chorionic gonadotrophins (Placentrax) 2–3 ml per sitting twice or thrice in a week for three to four weeks
- Surgical treatment is recommended in cases of progressive fibrosis when interincisor distance becomes less than 2 centimetres (0.79 in). (Multiple release incisions deep to mucosa, submucosa and fibrotic tissue and suturing the gap or dehiscence so created by mucosal graft obtained from tongue and Z-plasty. In this procedure multiple deep z-shaped incisions are made into fibrotic tissue and then sutured in a straighter fashion.)
- Pentoxifylline (Trental), a methylxanthine derivative that has vasodilating properties and increases mucosal vascularity, is also recommended as an adjunct therapy in the routine management of oral submucous fibrosis.
- IFN-gamma is an antifibrotic cytokine which alters collagen synthesis and helps in OSF.
- Colchicine tablets 0.5 mg twice a day
- Lycopene, 16 mg a day helps in improvement of OSF

The treatment of patients with oral submucous fibrosis depends on the degree of clinical involvement. If the disease is detected at a very early stage, cessation of the habit is sufficient. Most patients with oral submucous fibrosis present with moderate-to-severe disease. Severe oral submucous fibrosis is irreversible. Moderate oral submucous fibrosis is reversible with cessation of habit and mouth opening exercise. Current modern day medical treatments can make the mouth opening to normal minimum levels of 30 mm mouth opening with proper treatment.

== Research ==
Scientists have proven that intralesional injection of autologous bone marrow stem cells is a safe and effective treatment modality in oral submucosal fibrosis. It has been shown autologous bone marrow stem cell injections induces angiogenesis in the lesion area, which in turn decreases the extent of fibrosis, thereby leading to significant increase in mouth opening.

== Epidemiology ==
The incidence of the disease is higher in people from certain parts of the world including South and South East Asian, South Africa and the Middle Eastern countries. In 1996, the number of cases were estimated around 2.5 million worldwide but there is no population-base data as it is not notifiable disease. In India, the prevalence is estimated 0.2–2.3% in males and 1.2–4.6% in females; with age range of 11 to 60 years. It is widely reported in South Asian diaspora in Europe, North America and South Africa.

== History ==
In 1952, T. Sheikh coined the term distrophica idiopathica mucosa oris to describe an oral fibrosing disease he discovered in five Indian women from Kenya. S. G. Joshi subsequently coined the termed oral submucous fibrosis (OSF) for the condition in 1953.

== See also ==
- Cutaneous condition
