= Recaka =

Elements in classical Indian dance

Recakas (Rechakas) are elements in some classical Indian dance styles that describe minor variations in the main moves.

Padma Subrahmanyam compares the Recakas with Gamakas of Carnatic music. She says that the "Gamakas are the very life of the Raga."

- Pada-recaka - going from side to side with wavering feet or with differently moving feet.
- Kati-recaka- raising up the Trika and the turning of the waist as well as its drawing back
- Hasta-recaka - raising up, throwing out, putting forward, turning round and drawing back of the hand.
- Griva-recaka - raising up, lowering and bending the neck sideways, and other movements of it.

"Recakas impearl the Nritta, make it shine and cause complete aesthetic satisfaction," -- Padma Subrahmanyam.

The Pada (feet) Recakas "may utilize the space on the sides, move forward, slip or glide, waver, quiver, shake, proceed, turn away, swerve, sway, get pushed, jerk, slide, raise, lower, draw, release or whirl." Padma Subrahmanyam says that Recakas "cannot be enlisted or enumerated."
