= Narthaki.com =

Indian dance website

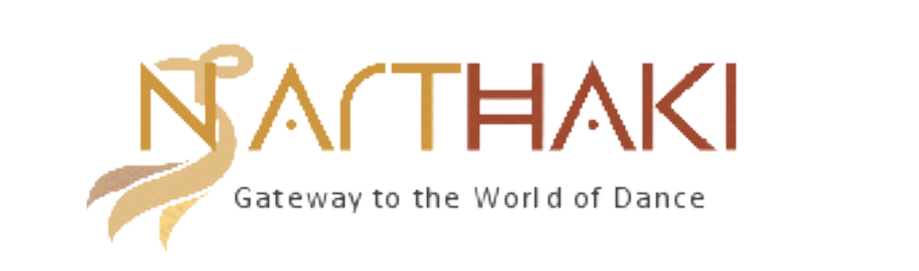
- Editor-in-Chief: Dr. Anita R Ratnam
- Editor: Lalitha Venkat
- Categories: Culture
- Frequency: Daily
- Format: Digital
- Founder: Dr. Anita R Ratnam
- Founded: April 14, 1992; 34 years ago
- First issue: April 14, 1992; 34 years ago
- Company: Narthaki: a directory of classical Indian dance - I (1992 - 1997); Narthaki: a directory of classical Indian dance - II (1997 - 2000); Narthaki.com (2000 - present)
- Country: India
- Based in: Chennai
- Language: English
- Website: www.narthaki.com

Narthaki.com is an Indian dance web portal founded by dancer and choreographer Dr. Anita R Ratnam. Established in 2000, it developed from a series of dance directories complied by Ratnam in the 1990s and serves as an online platform for information, commentary, and documentation related to Indian classical and contemporary dance.

The website publishes reviews, interviews, featured articles, event listings, and other dance related content. It has been described by several publications as a significant online resource for Indian dance.

== History ==
Narthaki originated from a directory project development by dancer and choreographer Anita Ratnam in early 1990s. According to Ratnam, the idea emerged after she encountered difficulties in locating contact information for Indian classical dancers while living in New York City, highlighting the lack of a centralized resource for the dance community.

Following her return to India, Ratnam begun compiling contact information for dancers, dance institutions, critics and performance venues. The project was first published as a printed directory in 1992 with approximately 1000 entires and was expanded in subsequent edition in 1997 to include around 2000 entries.

In April 2000, the directory was converted into an online platform with the launch of narthaki.com. Established as a digital resource dedicated to Indian Dance, the website was intended to improve access to information and facilitate connections among dancers, scholars, presenters, and audiences.

Over time, Narthaki expanded beyond its original directory format to include reviews, interviews, feature artists, previews, opinion pieces, photo essays, event listenings, and academic writing related to Indian classical and contemporary dance. Under the editorship of Lalitha Venkat, the platform developed into a prominent online publication covering Indian dance. Published profiles of Anita Ratnam have described Narthaki as "the online Bible for Indian classical dance", while other sources have referred to it as one of the largest web-based portals dedicated to Indian dance.

== Response to the COVID-19 pandemic ==
During the Covid-19 pandemic, Narthaki expanded its activities from digital publishing into a production and curation of online dance initiatives.Among its projects was BOXED - Dance Deletes Distancing, and international digital performance initiative developed in collaboration with dance and theater artist Chitra Sundaram. The project invited dancers to create short performance within domestic spaces during lockdown conditions and was noted for its innovative response to restrictions on live performance.

Additional initiatives launched during this period included Andal's Garden, Talam Talkies, A-Nidra, Epic Women and Devi Diaries, which explored themes ranging from devotional traditions to the relationship between dance and videography. The platform also hosted online conversations, interviews, and discussions involving artists and scholars from the performing arts community.

According to Ratnam, the pandemic period marked a significant shift in Narthaki's role, transforming it from primary informational portal into a producer and curator of digital dance programming.

== Neo Narthaki ==
In 2020, Ratnam launched Neo Narthaki as a sister initiative to Narthaki. Conceived as a platform for younger generations of dancers, particularly members of the global Indian diaspora, the project was intended to provide space for emerging voices and alternative perspectives within the dance community. According to several interviews, NeoNarthaki also sought to encourage dialogue on issues of diversity and representation within the performing arts, including participation by members of the LGBTQIA+ community.

== Recognition ==
Narthaki has been described by several publications as a major online resource for Indian dance. The New York Public Library has listed Narthaki among online resources relating to Indian dance. In 2017, Narthaki and its founder Anita Ratnam were jointly recognized with the inaugural Vishwa Kala Ratna International Arts Award presented by the United Kingdom based organization MilapFest. The award citation described Narthaki as a digital platform serving dancers, scholars, and audiences and acknowledged its contribution to the promotion of Indian arts internationally.

== Development and legacy ==
Narthaki has been described by several publications as a significant online resource for Indian dance and one of the largest web based portals dedicated to the field. Over more than three decades, it has evolved from a printed directory into a digital platform that documents, reviews, and disseminates information relating to Indian classical and contemporary dance. The platform has been noted for connecting dancers, scholars, presenters, and audiences across geographical boundaries and for contributing to the documentation of dance related activities and discourse. The New York Public Library has identified Narthaki as a source for Indian dance and related performing arts information. During the COVID-19 pandemic, Narthaki expanded into the production and curation of digital dance initiatives, reflecting broader shifts in the presentation and dissemination of performing arts through online media.

In addition to its online activities, Narthaki has expanded to include in-person and multimedia initiatives. These include Narthaki Studio Series, which presents emerging dance artists in an intimate performance settings, and the Narthaki Podcast, featuring conversations with dancers and other figures associated with the performing arts.

== Challenges and criticism ==
In interviews, founder Anita Ratnam has stated that Narthaki has faced criticism and opposition during its development. She has noted that some artists expressed dissatisfaction with editorial decisions, including selection of featured content and published reviews. Ratnam has also stated that the platform experienced several security breaches on two occasions and received anonymous negative messages from individuals who disagreed with its coverage. She has described such responses as challenges associated with maintaining an independent platform that publishes commentary and criticism within the performance arts sector.
