= Rajee Narayan =

Indian dancer and musician (1931–2020)

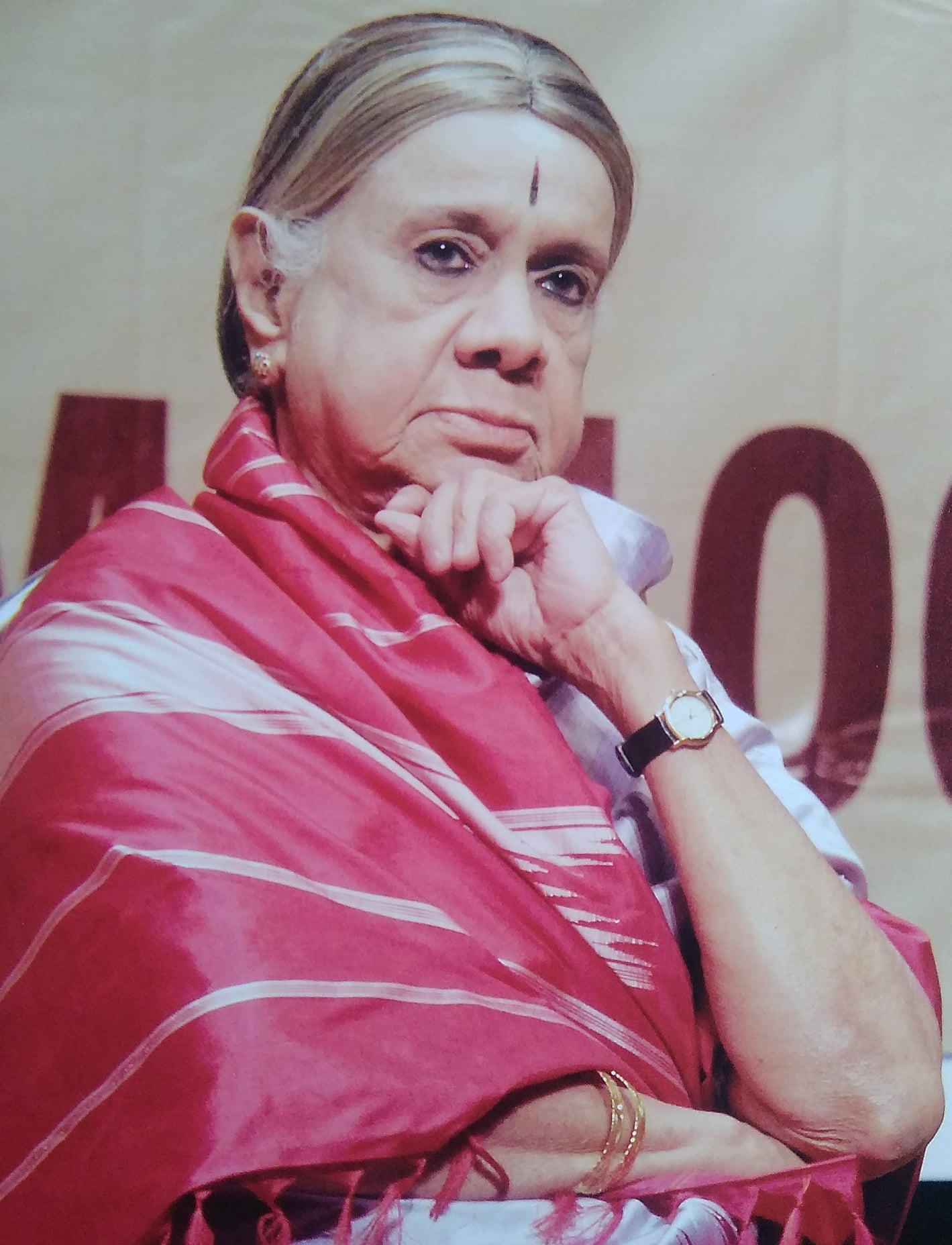
- Born: 19 August 1931; Madras, British Raj
- Died: 25 September 2020 (aged 89); Gurgaon, New Delhi, India
- Occupations: Bharatanatyam dance guru; choreographer; composer; musician
- Known for: Bharatanatyam
- Children: 1
- Awards: Sangeet Natak Akademi Award; Tagore Akademi Puraskar; Sangeetha Sikshamani; Swar Sadhna Ratna; M. S. Subbulakshmi Award
- Website: www.rajeenarayan.com

Rajee Narayan (19 August 1931 – 25 September 2020) was a Bharatanatyam dancer, musician and composer based in Mumbai, India. She was a combination of guru, musician, composer and choreographer, with the unique distinction of teaching not only Bharatanatyam, but also Carnatic Music, Natyasastra and Nattuvangam. She established her institution, Nritya Geethanjali, in Mumbai in 1965. She served as a board member of the University of Mumbai for over two decades and as an external examiner for the Bachelor's and master's degrees in the Fine Arts courses (Bachelor of Fine Arts and Master of Fine Arts) and an examiner of thesis for Ph.D.

== Formative years ==
Rajee Narayan was born on 19 August 1931 in Chennai, the 11th child of S. Narayana Iyer and Gangammal. Rajee started to learn Bharatanatyam at age 5, from her elder sister, Neela Balasubramaniam, founder-director, Nataraja Natya Niketan and K. Lalitha, founder-director, Sri Saraswathi Gana Nilayam.

At the age of four, Narayan commercially recorded the composition, 'Neraminchakura' (Shankarabharanam raga – Ikana tala). She also released records on story-telling songs for children and some plays. At that early age, she had started acting and singing her own songs in the movies that her father produced.

She participated in the dance-dramas and Kollata Jothrai festivals, conducted by Kadappai Lakshmiammal, through her sabha, Indumadar Lakshmi Vilasa Sabha, run specially for ladies.

== Compositions ==
Narayan has composed over 200 songs for bharatanatyam and has published some of them in her book Nritya Geetamala (2 volumes). She has also released a book on the basics of carnatic music called Sangeeta Shastra Mala. She is also the author of Natya shastra mala, a book explaining the basics of natya shastram.
