= Shalin Maria Lawrence =

Indian

Shalin Mariya Lawrence (born 25 August 1983) is an author, columnist, Intersectional feminist, ambedkarite, and social activist. She has been active in dalitism, feminism, social activism and literature. She has been giving voice and fighting for various issues like violence against Dalits, injustice towards the natives of Chennai, manual scavenging deaths, social advancement of transgender people, forced displacements of indigenous people of chennai, everyday problems faced by women, and human rights abuses. She has written the books 'Vada chenaikkaari, 'Sandaikkaarigal : aangalai punpaduththum pakkanga', and 'Jensy ean kuraivaaga paadinaar'. She is a renowned activist and writer of Dalit literature in Tamil Nadu.

== Early life ==
Shalin Maria Lawrence was born in Patalam, Madras. She is based in Chennai.

== Participation ==
- She was a member of a panel discussion titled 'Penn and Politics' held by Shakti, an organization that rallies for equal political power for women with the Madras School of Social Work.
- She was one of the two resource persons in the three days national meet of dalit Christian women for change.

== Special Mentions and Awards ==
Shalin was mentioned as one of the '11 crusaders for gender justice in India' by GroundReport, a digital news platform.

== Books ==
- Vadachennaikkaari – 2018 – Uyirmmai Pathiagam
- Sandaikaarikal: Aankalai Punpaduthum Pakkangal – 2022
- Jensy ean kuraivaaga paadinaar – 2018
