= C. V. Chandrasekhar =

Indian Bharatanatyam dancer and choreographer (1935–2024)

- Born: 22 May 1935; Simla, British India
- Died: 19 June 2024 (aged 89)
- Occupations: Dancer, academician, choreographer
- Years active: 1947–2024
- Spouse: Jaya Chandrashekar (1962–2024)
- Dancing career
- Dances: Bharatanatyam
- Website: nrityashree.com

C. V. Chandrasekhar (22 May 1935 – 19 June 2024) was an Indian Bharatanatyam dancer, academician, dance scholar, composer, and choreographer. He retired as Head of the Faculty of Performing Arts of M.S. University, Baroda in 1992. Professor Chandrasekhar and wife Jaya Chandrasekhar were one of the best known dancing couples of Bharata Natyam in India, during the 1970s and ’80s. They performed with their daughters Chitra and Manjari. Also, his grandchildren Viraj, Dhenuka, Harshavardhan and Amshuman were of great support to him. He ran his own dance institution, Nrityashree, in Chennai.

Chandrasekhar was awarded the Sangeet Natak Akademi Award for Bharatnatyam in 1993, by the Sangeet Natak Akademi, India's National Academy of Music, Dance and Drama, and received the Kalidas Samman in 2008. In 2011, he was honoured with the Padma Bhushan by the Government of India. Chandrasekhar died on 19 June 2024, at the age of 89.

== Early life and training ==
C.V. Chandrasekhar was born in Shimla on 22 May 1935. He was one of the eight siblings, with six brothers and two sisters. He was introduced to Carnatic Music during his childhood and began his formal training at Kalakshetra in1945. Chandrasekhar did his M. Sc., and thereafter received a postgraduate diploma (Bharatanatyam), after he trained at the internationally renowned Kalakshetra in Chennai, under the mentorship of Rukmini Devi Arundale, Karaikkal Saradambal, K.N. Dandaydhapani Pillai and others. He received training in classical music under teachers like Budulur Krishnamurthy Sastrigal and M.D. Ramanathan.

He married his wife, Jaya, a trained classical dancer and a licensed lawyer, in 1962. Together they had two daughters, Chitra and Manjari.

== Career ==
Chandrasekhar started his dancing career in 1947, when there were few male dancers. He served at the Banaras Hindu University and later joined M.S. University of Baroda, where he retired as the Head and Dean of the Faculty of Performing Arts in 1992. C.V. Chandrasekhar was a dancer, choreographer, researcher, musician, academician, composer and acclaimed teacher of Bharatanatyam.

He was performing for the last six decades of his life in India and all over the globe and was invited by many dancers the world over to teach and to choreograph. He continued to perform on stage well into his seventh decade.

== Death ==
C.V. Chandrashekar died on 19 June 2024. He was 89 years of age.
