= Channel 47 low-power TV stations in the United States =

The following low-power television stations broadcast on digital or analog channel 47 in the United States:

- K47JC-D in Wadena, Minnesota, to move to channel 22
- K47JE-D in Olivia, Minnesota, to move to channel 15
- K47JK-D in Pocatello, Idaho, to move to channel 20
- KWCC-LD in Wenatchee, Washington, to move to channel 25
- KWWO-LD in Walla Walla, Washington, Washington, to move to channel 32

The following television stations, which are no longer licensed, formerly broadcast on analog or digital channel 47 in the United States:

- K47AC in Silt, etc., Colorado
- K47AL in Ukiah, California
- K47AN in Duchesne, Utah
- K47BP-D in Follett, Texas
- K47BW in Lewiston, etc., Idaho
- K47DR in Farmington, New Mexico
- K47ED in College Station, Texas
- K47EH in Alturas, etc., California
- K47GD in San Luis Obispo, California
- K47GM-D in New Mobeetie, Texas
- K47HD in Emery, Utah
- K47HT in Roseburg, Oregon
- K47IP in Snyder, Texas
- K47KA in Minot, North Dakota
- K47KE in Huntsville, Utah
- K47LM-D in Prineville, etc., Oregon
- KCST-LP in Hoquiam, Washington
- KDFQ-LP in Prescott, Arizona
- KGDR-LP in Ruidoso, New Mexico
- KGNG-LP in Las Vegas, Nevada
- KIJR-LP in Lucerne Valley, California
- KKNF-LD in Lufkin, Texas
- KLPN-LD in Longview, Texas
- W47AC in Big Pine Key, Florida
- W47CK in Shallotte, North Carolina
- W47DA in Melbourne, Florida
- W47DM-D in Cullowhee, North Carolina
- W47DX-D in Canovanas, Puerto Rico
- WEKK-LD in Wausau, Wisconsin
