= George Arundale =

British theosophist (1878–1945)

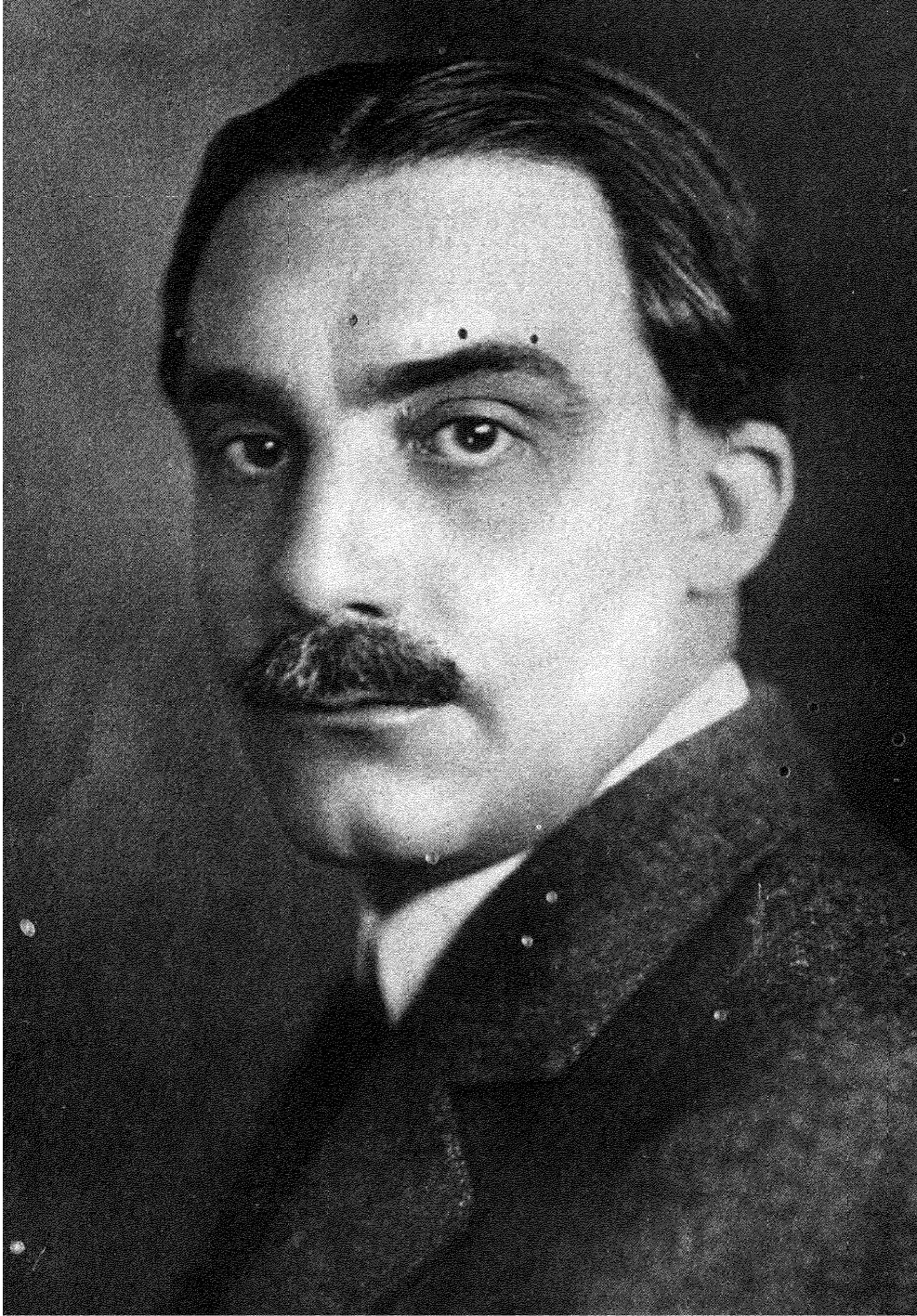
- Arundale as principal at Benaras

Personal details
- Born: 1 December 1878 Surrey, England
- Died: 12 August 1945 (aged 66) Adyar, India
- Denomination: Liberal Catholic
- Spouse: Rukmini Devi Arundale (m. 1920)
- Education: St John's College, Cambridge

George Sydney Arundale (1 December 1878 in Surrey, England — 12 August 1945 in Adyar, India) was a Theosophist, Co-Freemason, president of the Theosophical Society Adyar and a bishop of the Liberal Catholic Church. He was the husband of the Indian dancer Rukmini Devi Arundale.

== Early life ==
Arundale lost his mother at a young age and was adopted by his aunt, Francesca Arundale, a wealthy Theosophist. Initially, he was privately tutored by Charles Webster Leadbeater. Later, he moved with Francesca Arundale to Germany, where he went to school at the Gelehrte Gymnasium, Wiesbaden. Returning eventually to England, he received a master's degree from St John's College, Cambridge.

== India ==
Another major centre of the society was Varanasi, a city held holy in Indian spiritualism. In 1902 Arundale and his aunt moved to Varanasi, where he took a position as a history teacher at the Central Hindu College (CHC). In 1909, he was appointed its principal. In 1912 Arundale gave a speech in Adyar to the Theosophical Society which inspired the founding of St Christopher School in Letchworth Garden City where it still operates under its founding principles.

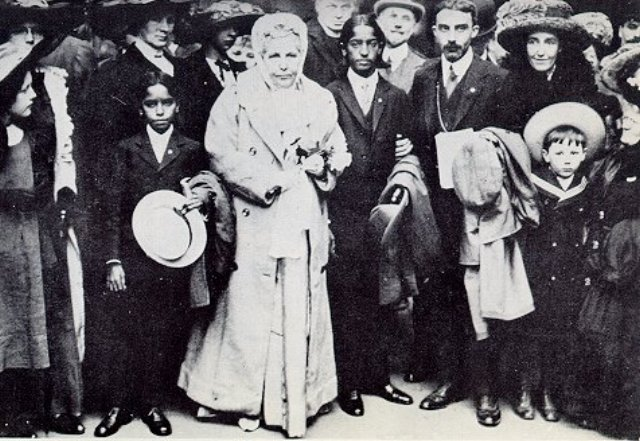
Annie Besant arrives in Charing Cross Station, London with Jiddu Krishnamurti, his younger brother Nityananda, and George Arundale, prominent Theosophist and tutor to the boys. (Picture and caption appear on page 84 of Krishnamurti: The Years of Awakening by Mary Lutyens)

During the early 20th-century, many Theosophists believed in the imminent appearance of a messianic entity, the so-called Maitreya or World Teacher. Around this time, a young boy named Jiddu Krishnamurti was identified by a leading Theosophist Charles Leadbeater as being the probable "vehicle" of the expected Messiah (Krishnamurti later repudiated the idea). Arundale was selected as one of Krishnamurti's private tutors. He was a firm believer in the Coming of the World Teacher, and in late 1910 formed a clandestine society, the Order of the Rising Sun (later renamed Order of the Star in the East), which was intended to further this cause. Most of the recruits were students and staff at the CHC. There was great commotion when the existence and the activities of the society eventually became public; following opposition to the order by the school's Trustees and administrators, in 1913 Arundale and other staff members resigned their positions and left the school.

After a holiday in England, he returned to India to devote himself to the activities of the Theosophical Society. He and his aunt settled at the society's sprawling campus at Adyar in Madras. The Indian Independence Movement was picking up pace during these years, as was a revival of interest and pride in the ancient culture and philosophies of India. The Theosophical Society was supportive of both these currents. In 1917, he was one of a group of Theosophists who, along with Annie Besant, organized the National University of India at Chennai, near the headquarters of the society. Rabindranath Tagore became the first chancellor of the university. In June the same year, Arundale was arrested along with Besant and Bahman Pestonji Wadia by the British authorities for having become involved in the Indian Independence Movement.

== Marriage ==
During his years in Adyar, Arundale came into contact with the family of Nilakanta Sastri, a fellow Theosophist, and fell in love with his daughter, Rukmini. This was considered scandalous: Rukmini belonged to a Hindu family orthodox enough to disapprove of Sastri's involvement with the Theosophists, whom they regarded as a bizarre quasi-Christian sect; there were considerations of race, religion and cultural background; and Rukmini was too young to be Arundale's wife, being twenty-six years younger than he was.

Not withstanding these considerations and the uproar raised by Rukmini's family, they were married in 1920, when Rukmini turned sixteen and he was forty-two. Arundale mentored Rukmini and encouraged her to develop her interest in classical dance. Rukmini went on to being instrumental in rejuvenating the Bharatanatyam style of classical dance. Accordingly, it is as the husband of Rukmini Devi Arundale that George Arundale is best known in India today.

== Career ==
Following his wedding, he deemed it best to reside outside Chennai for a few years and accepted an offer from the Maharaja of Indore in central India to serve as the Commissioner of Education of that state. One of his initiatives in Indore was to open a museum known as Navaratna Mandir which contained the biographies and memorabilia of great people from around the world to serve as an inspiration for young students. This became the precursor to the Central Museum in Indore.

He continued to devote much of his time to the activities of the Theosophical Society. In 1924, his aunt died in Adyar and he inherited a considerable fortune. In 1926, he became bishop of the Liberal Catholic Church, a theosophical body with no connection to Roman Catholicism. The same year, he was appointed General Secretary of the Theosophical Society in Australia and moved there with his wife. One of their co-passengers on the voyage to Australia was the ballet dancer Anna Pavlova, who quickly became a friend of the Arundales. When Rukmini expressed admiration for Pavlova's art and the desire to learn from her, the latter advised her to look instead to the classical traditions of India and work towards their revival. Rukmini took her advice to heart and later became the doyenne of the revival of Bharatanatyam in India.

In 1934, George Arundale became president of the Theosophical Society Adyar. The same year, he founded the Besant Memorial School within the Society's campus. He later prevailed on Maria Montessori to come and take charge of the school. Montessori came to Adyar in 1939 and worked as a teacher at this school for three years, influencing the institution greatly.

In 1936, the Arundales founded Kalakshetra, a now venerable institution devoted to researching and teaching Indian classical dance. Until 1948, Kalakshetra was located within the sprawling campus of the Theosophical Society at Adyar.

Arundale became a Freemason in 1902 as a member of what is now called Le Droit Humain and remained one to the end of his days. He also worked for the World Federation of Young Theosophists. In the last decade of his life, he wrote several books and monographs regarding Theosophy. He died peacefully in 1945 at his residence in Adyar.

== Works ==
- Freedom and friendship. Theosophical Publishing House, Madras 1935.
- Kundalini, an occult experience. Theosophical Publishing House, Madras 1938.
- Mount Everest, its spiritual attainment. Theosophical Press, Wheaton 1933.
- Nirvana, A Study In Synthetic Consciousness. Theosophical Press, Chicago 1926.
- The Lotus Fire, A Study in Symbolic Yoga. Theosophical Publishing House, Madras 1939.
- Thoughts on 'At The Feet of the Master'. Theosophical Publishing House (American Branch), Hollywood 1919.
