= Arangetram (dance) =

First stage performance of an Indian classical dance student

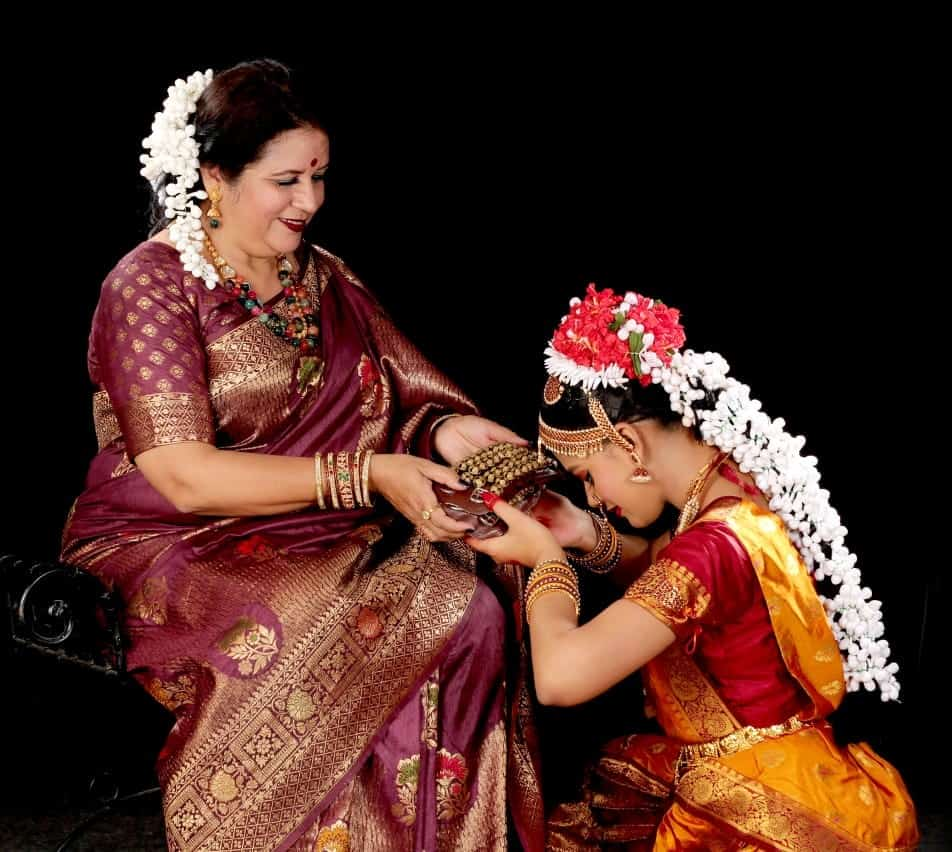
Bharatanatyam student and guru at Arangetram ceremony

Arangetram in Tamil (araṅkēṟṟam, அரங்கேற்றம்) and Malayalam (araṅgēṟṟaṃ, അരങ്ങേറ്റം), known as "raṃgapravēśa" (ರಂಗಪ್ರವೇಶ) in Kannada and "raṃgapravēśaṃ" (రంగప్రవేశం) in Telugu is the debut on-stage performance of a former student of Indian classical dance and music that follows years of training in classical music and dancing. Many Indian classical dance forms require their followers to perform an arangetram. Once a student has done so, they are thereafter allowed to perform dances on their own and to teach aspiring dancers.

== Etymology ==
Arangetram is a compound of the Tamil words for stage ("araṅku") and ascent ("ēṟṟam") and its literal translation is "climbing or ascending the stage". In the context of dance, the word refers to the graduation ceremony in which the guru presents his or her pupil to the public. Its origins can be traced to the devdasi (temple dancer) tradition. Arangetram can be performed for other Indian classical dance styles such as Kuchipudi, Manipuri, Kathakali, Bharatanatyam, and Mohiniattam as well as vocal and instrument recitals like Mridangam, ghatam, and violin.
