= E. Krishna Iyer =

Indian classical dancer

E Krishna Iyer
- Born: 9 August 1897; Kallidaikurichi, Madras Presidency
- Died: 1968 (age 71); Madras, Tamil Nadu, India

E. Krishna Iyer (9 August 1897 – January 1968) was an Indian lawyer, freedom fighter, classical artist and activist. He was a follower of traditional Isaivellalar practitioners of Sadir, also known as Bharatanatyam.

== Early life ==
Krishna Iyer was born on 9 August 1897 in a Tamil Brahmin family of Kallidaikurichi, Madras Presidency. He had his schooling at Ambasamudram High School and graduated from Madras Christian College. He studied law at Madras Law College and practised as a lawyer at the Madras High Court till 1943.

Krishna Iyer joined the Indian independence movement and was an active member of the Indian National Congress in the 1930s. He strived to popularize the songs of Indian nationalist Subrahmanya Bharathy.

== Association with art ==
On completion of his graduation, he entered a drama troupe in which he enacted female parts. He developed an avid interest in classical arts and also studied carnatic music during this time.

== The Bharatanatyam revival movement ==
Krishna Iyer's involvement with the Bharatanatyam revival movement began when he joined a theatrical company called Suguna Vilasa Sabha and learnt sadir, a sensuous and less respectful form of Bharatnatyam practised by devadasis. He understood the greatness of the art and lamented the disrespect shown and stigma attached to it due to its association with devadasis. Krishna Iyer founded the Madras Music Academy and teamed with Rukmini Devi Arundale to save the dance art from dying out. Krishna Iyer also patronized carnatic music and wrote as an art critic for the Indian Express, Dinamani and Kalki.

== Coining of the term Bharatanatyam ==
In the late 1920s and the early 1930s, attempts were made to abolish the devadasi system due to the efforts of Muthulakshmi Reddy, the first woman to be elected to the Madras Legislative Council. She also desired to do away with sadir due to its association with the devadasi system and condemned nautch performances in the Presidency. Krishna Iyer vehemently protested against Muthulakshmi Reddy's attitude towards sadir in a series of letters published in the Madras Mail and sought to give the dance form a measure of respect by proposing a resolution at a 1932 meeting of the Madras Music Academy to rename it as "Bharatanatyam" or Indian dance.

While strongly condemning the devadasi system, Krishna Iyer tried to sever the dance's association with the practice by encouraging Brahmin girls to learn and practice the art and by eradicating expressions and movements that conveyed sexually-explicit meanings in cooperation with Rukmini Devi Arundale. The stigma associated with Bharatanatyam, however, did not disappear altogether until the passing of the Devadasi Dedication Abolition Act in 1947.

== Awards ==
- 1966 – Padma Shri from the Government of India
- Sangeetha Kalasikhamani, 1957 by The Indian Fine Arts Society, Chennai

== Death ==
Krishna Iyer died in 1968 at the age of 71.
