= Kalakshetra Foundation =

Art school in Besant Nagar, India

Location
- Besant Nagar, Chennai, India; 12.9881°N 80.26500°E

Information
- Established: January 1936; 90 years ago
- Founder: Rukmini Devi Arundale
- Chairman: S. Ramadorai
- Director: Suresh Kumar Chikkala
- Website: www.kalakshetra.in

Kalakshetra Foundation, formerly simply Kalakshetra, is an arts and cultural academy dedicated to the preservation of traditional values in Indian art and crafts, especially in the field of Bharatanatyam dance and Gandharvaveda music. Based in Chennai, India, the academy was founded in January 1936 by Rukmini Devi Arundale and her husband George Arundale. Under Arundale's guidance, the institution achieved national and international recognition for its unique style and perfectionism. In 1962, Kalakshetra moved to a new 40-hectare campus in Besant Nagar, Chennai.

In January 1994, an Act of the Parliament of India recognised the Kalakshetra Foundation as an "Institute of National Importance." The current Chairman of Kalakshetra is S. Ramadorai and the current director is Revathi Ramachandran.

== History ==
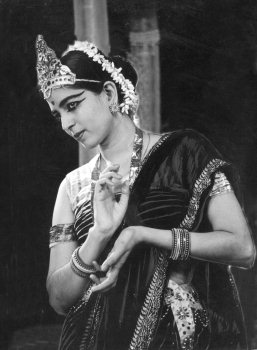
Rukmini Devi Arundale, founder of Kalakshetra

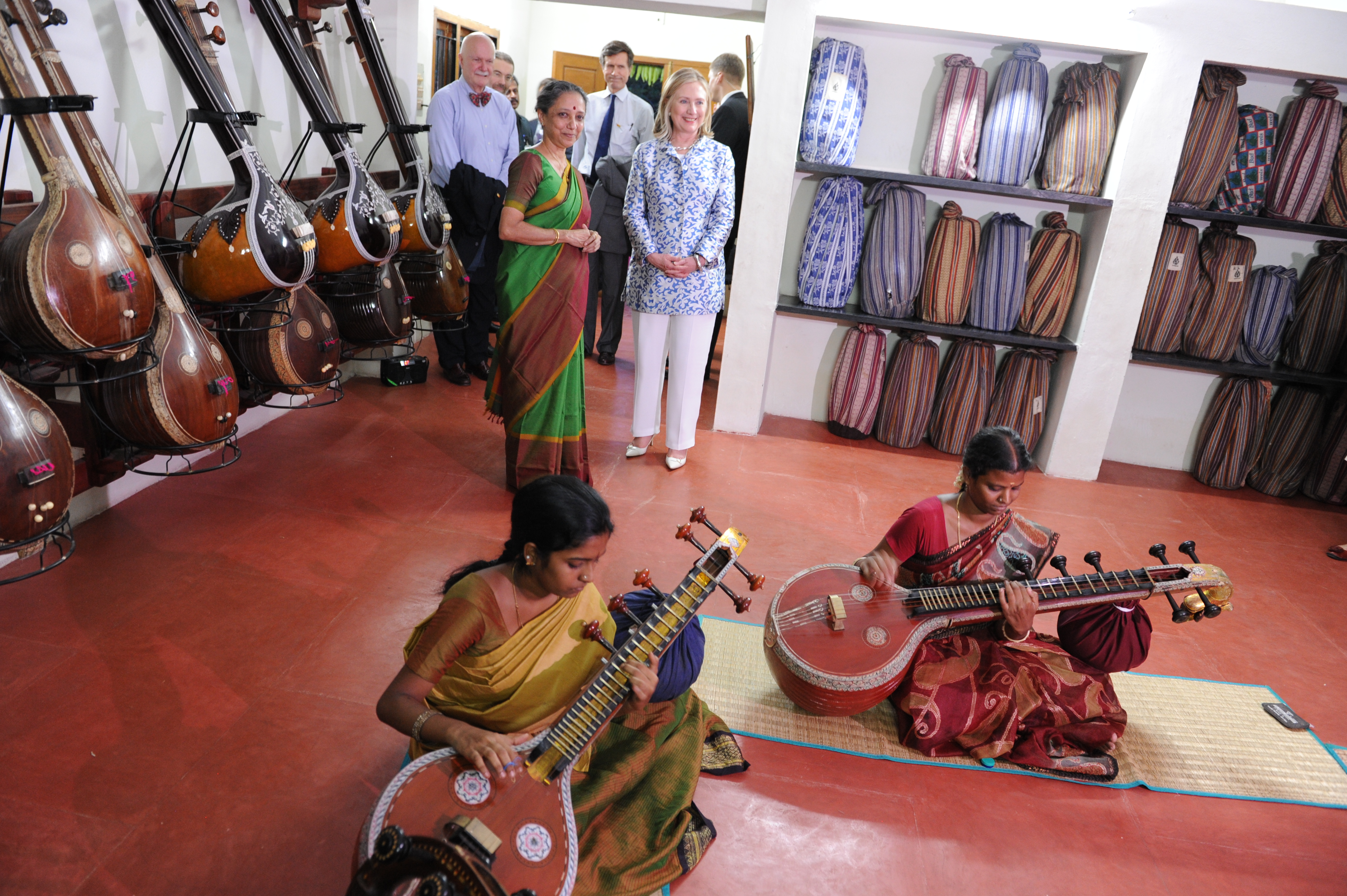
A music classroom at Kalakshetra

Kalakshetra, later known as the Kalakshetra Foundation, was established by Rukmini Devi Arundale, along with her husband, George Arundale, a well-known theosophist, in Adyar, Chennai, in 1936. She invited not only the best students but also noted teachers, musicians and artists to be a part of this institution. In 1944, the University of Madras granted its affiliation for conducting diploma courses in Music, Dance and Painting & Crafts.

Year-long celebrations, including lectures, seminars and festivals marked her 100th birth anniversary, on 29 February 2004, at Kalakshetra and elsewhere in many parts of the world. Also on 29 February, a photo exhibition on her life opened at the Lalit Kala Gallery in New Delhi, and President A. P. J. Abdul Kalam released a photo-biography, written and compiled by Sunil Kothari, with a foreword by former president Ramaswamy Venkataraman. In 2016, marking its 80th year, the Kalakshetra Foundation held a 'Remembering Rukmini Devi' festival of music and dance.

== Kalakshetra style ==
Having studied the Pandanallur style for three years, in 1936 Rukmini Devi Arundale started working on developing her own, Kalakshetra, style of Bharatanatyam. She introduced group performances and staged various Bharatanatyam-based ballets.

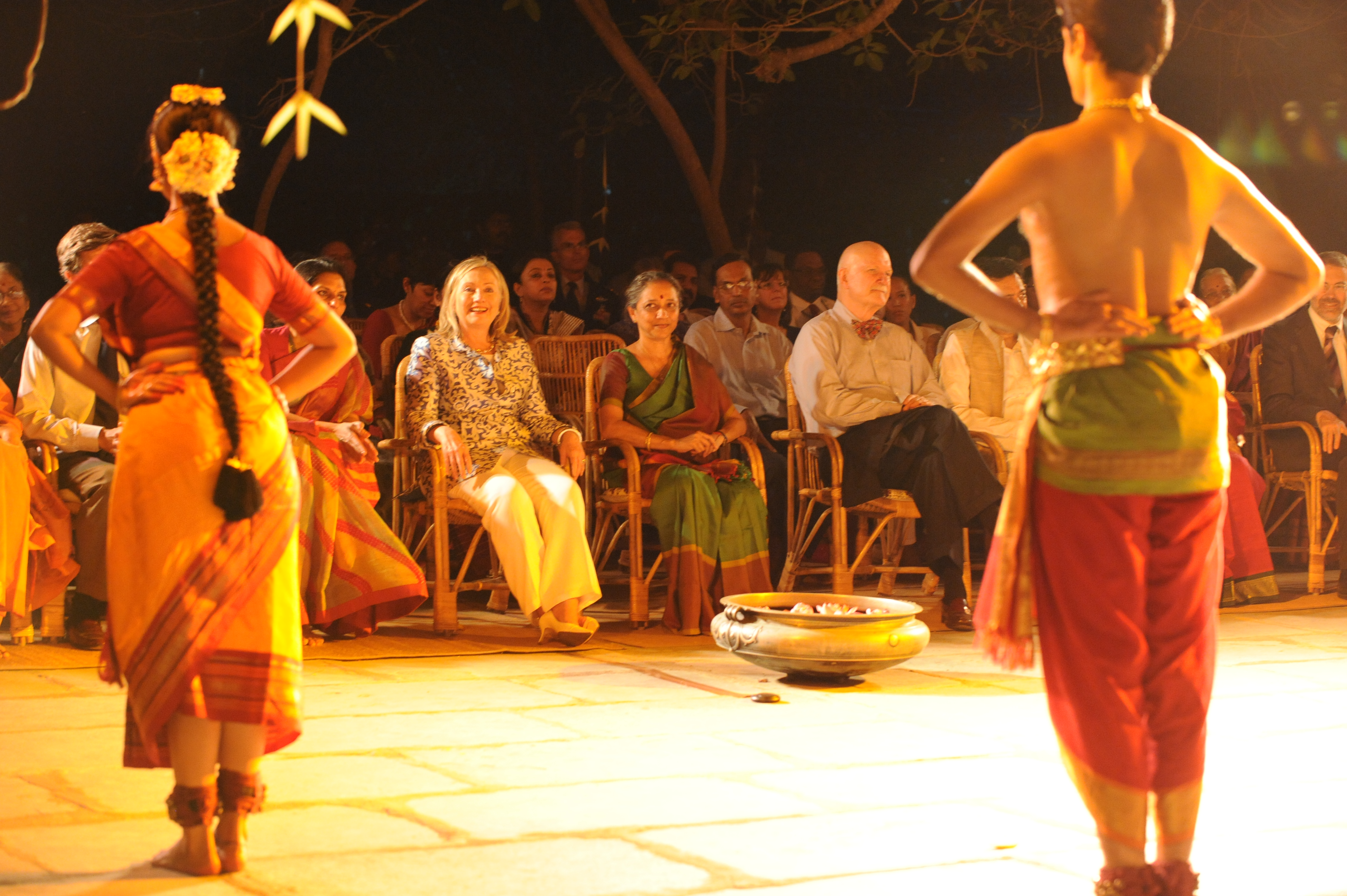
Bharatanatyam performance at Kalakshetra, during visit of Hillary Clinton, 2011

The Kalakshetra style is noted for its angular, straight, ballet-like kinesthetics, and its avoidance of Recakas and of the uninhibited throw (Ksepa) of the limbs.

According to Sankara Menon (1907–2007), who was her associate from Kalakshetra's beginnings, Rukmini Devi raised Bharatanatyam to a puritan art form, divorced from its recently controversial past by "removing objectionable elements" (mostly, the Sringara, certain emotional elements evocative of the erotic, such as hip, neck, lip and chest movements) from the Pandanallur style, which was publicly criticized by Indian dancer Tanjore Balasaraswati (1918–1984) and other representatives of Tamil Nadu's traditional Isai Velalar culture. Love outside parameters considered "chaste" was not to be portrayed. Balasaraswati said that "the effort to purify Bharatanatyam through the introduction of novel ideas is like putting a gloss on burnished gold or painting the lotus". Lawyer and classical artist E. Krishna Iyer (1897–1968) said about Rukmini Devi, "There is no need to say that before she entered the field, the art was dead and gone or that it saw a renaissance only when she started to dance or that she created anything new that was not there before".

== Controversy ==
In December 2022, allegations of sexual abuse in the campus began to surface after former director Leela Samson wrote a social media post accusing a teacher of harassing and molesting students, but hadn't specified the name of the teacher. In the following months, over a hundred students of Kalakshetra Foundation's Rukmini Devi College of Fine Arts accused senior faculty member, Hari Padman, of sexual harassment. The accusations spanned a number of years. Padman was exonerated following an internal investigation, and Kalakshetra Foundation issued a gag order preventing students and staff from discussing the allegations. On 21 March 2023, the National Commission for Women began investigating the allegations, but closed the investigation shortly, after a victim denied any sexual harassment during an enquiry. On 30 March, the students began protests against the inaction of the Kalakshetra authorities, by walking out of a routine morning prayer when Padman walked in. The protests prompted a response from the Tamil Nadu Chief Minister M. K. Stalin, after which an FIR was registered against Padman by the Tamil Nadu police. The Tamil Nadu State Commission for Women also launched an investigation and received over 90 written complaints regarding various issues faced by the students of the foundation. Padman was arrested by the Tamil Nadu police on 3 April 2023. In response, Padman's wife Divya Hari Padman filed a counter complaint against the victim and two teachers working in the institute. Amidst the sexual harassment allegations, students also raised complaints about mismanagement by the foundation director Revathi Ramachandran, referring to the coverup of a food poisoning outbreak in November 2021.

== Institutes ==
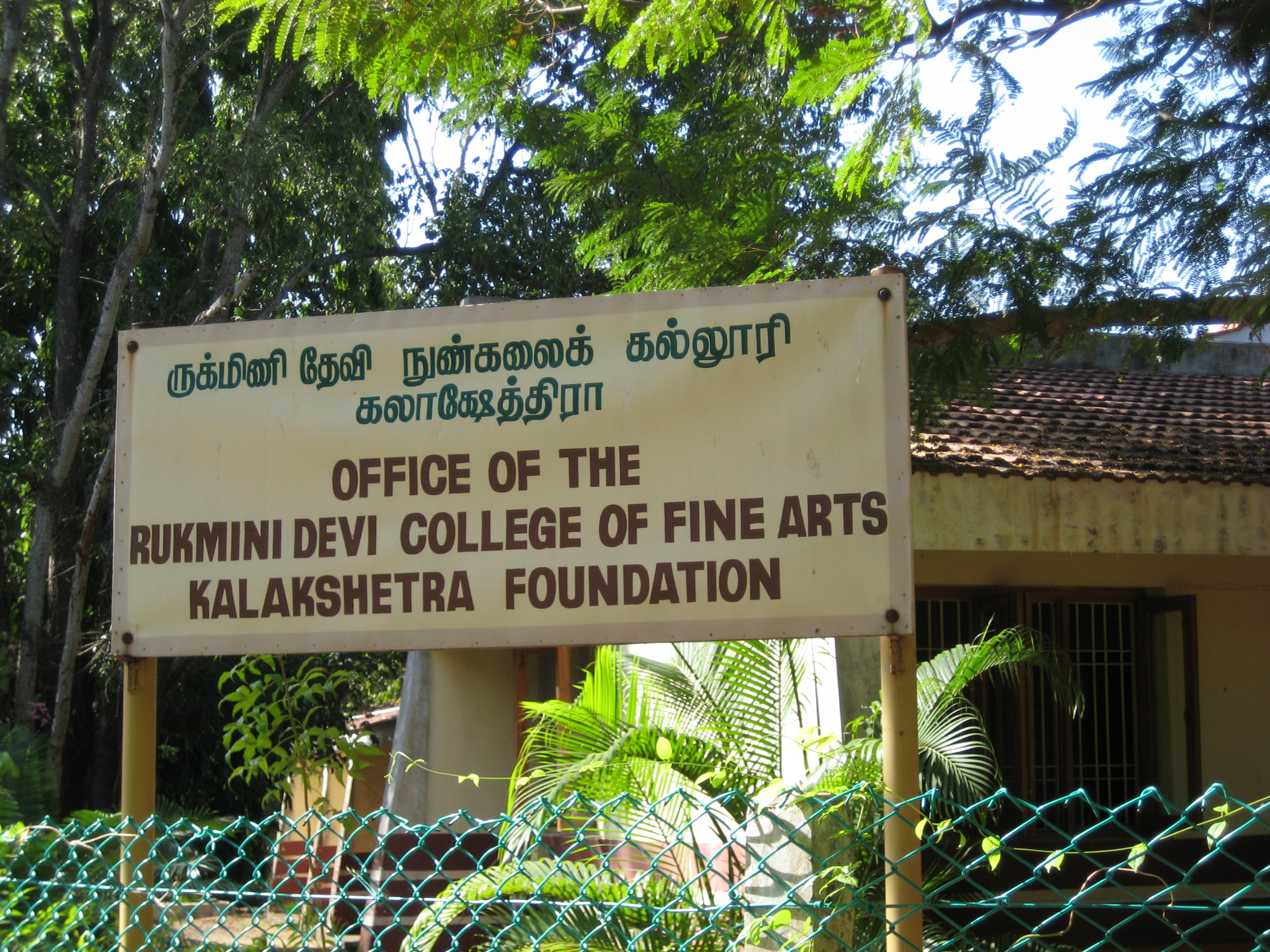
Office of Kalakshetra Academy at Besant Nagar

- Rukmini Devi College of Fine Arts
- Rukmini Devi Museum
- Koothambalam (Kalakshetra theatre)
- Craft Education and Research Centre (including the weaving department, the Kalamkari natural dye printing and the painting unit)

== Notable alumni ==
Notable alumni include

- Radha Burnier,
- Amala Akkineni,
- Kamaladevi Chattopadhyay,
- Sanjukta Panigrahi,
- C.V. Chandrasekhar,
- Dhananjayans,
- Adyar K. Lakshman,
- Anita Ratnam
- Jayashree Narayanan,
- Kalakshetra Vilasini,
- Leela Samson,
- Satyavati Motiram Sirsat,
- Jaya Thyagarajan,
- Devoleena Bhattacharjee,
- Ananda Shankar Jayant.

== Bibliography ==
- Fredericks, Leo: Poet in Kalakshetra. Madras 1977
- Kalakshetra Foundation (Hrsg.): Kalakshetra Brochure
- Nachiappan, C.: Rukmini Devi, Bharata Natya. Kalakshetra Publications, Chennai 2003
- Nachiappan, C.: Rukmini Devi, Dance Drama. Kalakshetra Publications, Chennai 2003
- Ramani, Shakuntala: Sari, the Kalakshetra tradition. Kalakshetra Foundation, Chennai 2002
- Sarada, S.: Kalakshetra-Rukmini Devi, reminiscences. Kala Mandir Trust, Madras 1985
