= Rukmini Devi Arundale =

Indian dancer and choreographer (1904–1986)

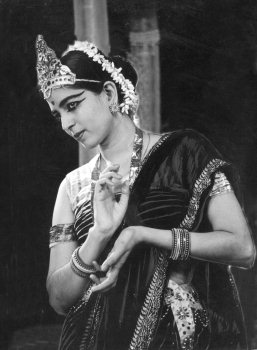
- Born: Rukmani Neelakanta Sastri; 29 February 1904; Madurai, India
- Died: 24 February 1986 (aged 81); Chennai, Tamil Nadu, India
- Years active: 1920–1986
- Spouse: George Arundale (m. 1920)
- Awards: Padma Bhushan (1956); Sangeet Natak Akademi Fellowship (1967)

Member of Parliament, Rajya Sabha
- In office 3 April 1952 – 2 April 1962
- Constituency: Nominated

Rukmini Devi Arundale (née Sastri; 29 February 1904 – 24 February 1986) was an Indian theosophist, dancer and choreographer of the Indian classical dance form of Bharatanatyam, and an activist for animal welfare.

She was the first woman in Indian history to be nominated as a member of the Rajya Sabha, the upper house of the Parliament of India. As the most important revivalist of Bharatanatyam from its original 'sadhir' style prevalent amongst the temple dancers, the Devadasis, she also worked for the re-establishment of traditional Indian arts and crafts.

She espoused the cause of Bharatanatyam, which was considered a vulgar art form in the early 1920s. Recognising its beauty and value, she not only learned the dance, but also presented it on stage despite strong public protests.

Rukmini Devi features in India Today's list of '100 People Who Shaped India'. She was awarded the Padma Bhushan in 1956, and the Sangeet Natak Akademi Fellowship in 1967.

== Biography ==
=== Early life and marriage ===
Rukmini Devi was born in British Raj India in a Tamil Brahmin family on 29 February 1904 in Madurai of Tamil Nadu. Her father, Neelakanta Sastri, was an engineer with the Public Works Department and a scholar, and her mother Seshammal was a music enthusiast. He had a transferable job and the family moved frequently. He was introduced to the Theosophical Society in 1901. Her brother, Nilakanta Sri Ram, later became the president of the Theosophical Society. Deeply influenced by the Theosophical Movement as a follower of Dr. Annie Besant, Neelakanta Shastri moved to Adyar, Chennai after retirement, where he built his home near the headquarters of the Theosophical Society Adyar. It was here that young Rukmini was exposed to not just theosophical thought, but also to new ideas on culture, theatre, music, and dance. Her meeting with the prominent British theosophist Dr George Arundale—a close associate of Annie Besant and later the principal of the Central Hindu College in Varanasi—led to her building a lasting bond with him.

They married in 1920 when she turned 16 and he was 26 years her senior at 42, much to the shock of the then conservative society. After marriage, she traveled around the world, meeting fellow theosophists and also forging friendships with the educator Maria Montessori, and the poet James Cousins. In 1923, she became the president of the All-India Federation of Young Theosophists, and the president of the World Federation of Young Theosophists in 1925.

In 1928, the famous Russian ballerina Anna Pavlova visited Bombay and the Arundale couple went to her performance, and later happened to travel on the same ship as her, to Australia where she was to perform next; over the course of the journey their friendship grew, and soon Rukmini Devi started learning dance from one of Anna's leading solo dancers, Cleo Nordi. It was later, at the behest of Anna, that Rukmini Devi turned her attention to discovering traditional Indian dance forms which had fallen to disrepute, and dedicated the rest of her life to their revival.

=== Revivalism ===
In 1933, at the Annual Conference of Madras Music Academy, she saw for the first time a performance of the dance form called the Sadhir. Later she learnt the dance from Mylapore Gowri Ammal and finally with the help of E Krishna Iyer from 'Pandanallur Meenakshi Sundaram Pillai'. In 1935, Rukmini Devi gave her first public performance at the 'Diamond Jubilee Convention of the Theosophical Society.

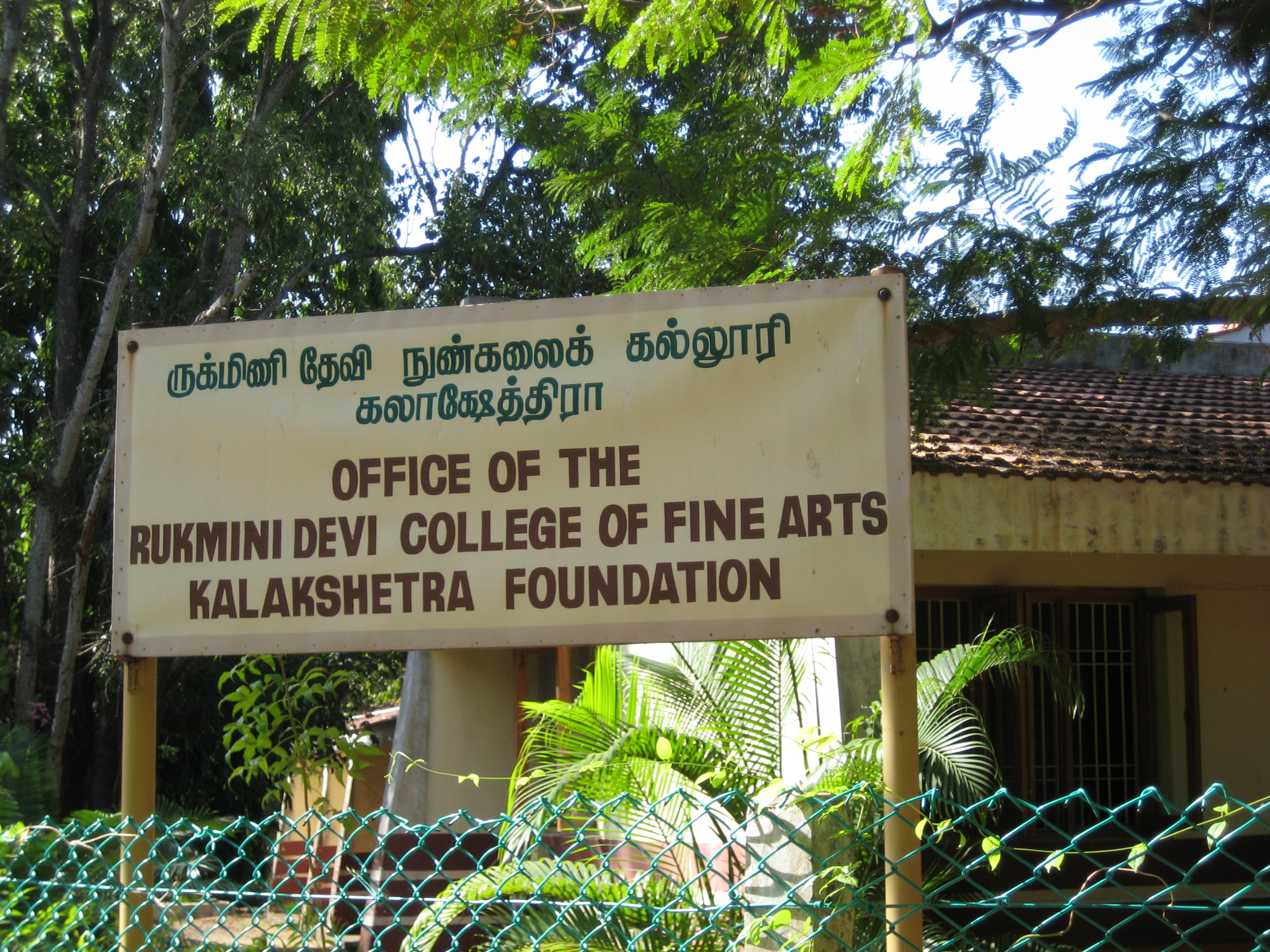
Office of Kalakshetra Academy at Besant Nagar, Chennai

In January 1936, she along with her husband, established Kalakshetra, an academy of dance and music, built around the ancient Indian Gurukul system, at Adyar, at Chennai. Today the academy is a deemed university under the Kalakshetra Foundation and is situated in its new in 100-acre (0.40 km^{2}) campus in Tiruvanmiyur, Chennai, where it shifted, in 1962. Amongst its noted students are Radha Burnier, Sarada Hoffman, Anjali Mehr, Kamaladevi Chattopadhyay, Sanjukta Panigrahi, C V Chandrasekhar, Yamini Krishnamurthy and Leela Samson.

Previously known for the last few centuries as sadhir (Tamil: சதிராட்டம்), the Indian classical dance form of Bharatanatyam owes its current name to E Krishna Iyer and Rukmini Devi Arundale, who had been instrumental in modifying mainly the Pandanallur style of Bharatanatyam and bringing it to the global attention, and removing the extraneous sringaar and erotic elements from the dance, which were the legacy of its Devadasi association in the past. Soon she changed the very face of the dance, by introducing musical instruments, like violin, set and lighting design elements, and innovative costumes, and jewellery inspired by the temple sculptures. Just as for her teacher she approached noted gurus in various arts and classical dances, for her productions, Rukmini Devi approached noted scholars for inspiration and classical musicians and artists, for collaboration, the result was the creation some of pioneering dance dramas-based on Indian epics like the Valmiki's Ramayana and Jayadeva's Gita Govinda. Starting with famous dance dramas like, 'Sita Swayamvaram', 'Sri Rama Vanagamanam', 'Paduka Pattabhishekam' and 'Sabari Moksham', followed by 'Kutrala Kuruvanji', 'Ramayana', 'Kumara Sambhavam', 'Gita Govindam' and 'Usha Parinayam'.

Schools based on the Montessori method were first started in India, when Dr George Arundale invited Dr Maria Montessori to start courses in the 'Besant Theosophical High School' in 1939, and later also established, the 'Besant Arundale Senior Secondary School', The College of Fine Arts, The Besant Theosophical High School, The Maria Montessori School for Children, The Craft Education and Research Centre and the U. V. Swaminatha Iyer Library, within the Kalakshetra campus.

She also introduced a trend by inducing persons like Kamala Rani to learn nattuvangam for conducting recitals. Nattuvanars who guarded their own turf, were not given to teaching Devadasis Nattuvangam, which was a separate discipline of recitation of rhythmic syllables along with playing the cymbals. Yet another trend ushered in by her, in a female oriented Bharat Natam tradition, was introducing the male dancer in his own right. Exceptional gurus like Muthukumar Pillai who danced with his sister Kannamba and famous Thiruvarur Gyanam or even guru Kuppaiya Pillai performed in female disguise, which Krishna Iyer, also did.

=== Later years ===
Rukmini Devi was nominated as a member of the Indian Parliament's Council of States (the Rajya Sabha) in April 1952 and re-nominated in 1956. She was the first Indian woman to be nominated to the Rajya Sabha. Keenly interested in animal welfare, she was associated with various humanitarian organisations, and as a member of the Rajya Sabha, She was instrumental in enacting the legislation for the Prevention of Cruelty to Animals Act and for later setting up of the Animal Welfare Board of India, under her chairmanship in 1962. She remained on the board until her demise in 1986.

She did much work to promote vegetarianism in the country. She served as the vice-president of International Vegetarian Union for 31 years from 1955, until her death.

In 1977, Morarji Desai offered to nominate her for the post of President of India twice, an offer she turned down. In 1978, 'Kalamkari Centre' (pencraft) was set up at Kalakshetra to revitalise the ancient Indian craft of textile printing. On encouragement from Kamaladevi Chattopadhyay, she encouraged natural dyeing and weaving at Kalakshetra. She died on 24 February 1986 in Chennai.

== Legacy ==
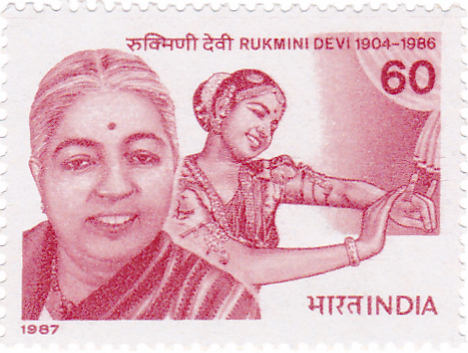
Rukmini Devi on a 1987 stamp of India

In January 1994, an Act of the Indian Parliament recognised the Kalakshetra Foundation as an 'Institute of National Importance'.

Year-long celebrations, including lectures, seminars and festivals marked her 100th birth anniversary, on 29 February, in 2004 at Kalakshetra and elsewhere in many parts of the world, On campus, the day was marked by a special function in which old students gathered from across India and the world, in a day of songs and recitals. Also on 29 February, a photo exhibition on her life opened at the Lalit Kala Gallery in New Delhi, and on the same day, then President APJ Abdul Kalam released a photo-biography, written and compiled by Dr Sunil Kothari with a foreword by former president R Venkataraman.

In 2016, Google honored Rukmini Devi on her 112th birthday with a doodle, and later in the month, to mark the 80th anniversary, the Kalakshetra Foundation held, 'Remembering Rukmini Devi’ festival of music and dance. Google also featured her in the 2017 Google Doodle for International Women's Day.

== Awards and honours ==
- 1955, Rukmini Devi Arundale was elected Vice President of International Vegetarian Union, IVU
- Padma Bhushan (1956)
- Sangeet Natak Akademi Award (1957)
- Desikothama (1972), Viswa Bharati University
- 1967 Sangeet Natak Akademi Fellowship
- Prani Mitra (1968), Friend of All Animals, (Animal Welfare Board of India)
- Kalidas Samman (1984), Govt of Madhya Pradesh
- D. Lit. (Honoris Causa), Indira Kala Sangit Vishwavidyalaya, Khairagarh, Chhattisgarh
- Queen Victoria Silver Medal, Royal Society for the Prevention of Cruelty to Animals, London
- Addition to the roll of honour by The World Federation for the Protection of animals, The Hague
- Honorary Doctorate, Wayne State University, United States
- Scrolls of Honour, County and City of Los Angeles

== See also ==
- Indian women in dance
- List of animal rights advocates
