= Adyar K. Lakshman =

Indian dancer and choreographer (1933–2014)

- Born: Adyar K. Lakshman; 16 December 1933; Kuppam, Madras Presidency, British India
- Died: 19 August 2014 (aged 80); Chennai, Tamil Nadu, India
- Education: Kalakshetra
- Known for: Bharathanatyam, Indian Classical Music
- Notable work: Alarippu, Pushpanjali
- Awards: Padma Shri (1989); Sangeet Natak Akademi Award (1991)

Adyar K. Lakshman (16 December 1933 – 19 August 2014) was a noted Indian Bharatnatyam dancer, choreographer, and guru.

== Early life ==
Born on 16 December 1933, Adyar K. Lakshman hailed from Kuppam in Chittoor district of Andhra Pradesh. His father, Krishnaraja Rao, was posted there as a school teacher. Lakshman and his brother Rama Rao were discovered at a young age by P.D. Doraiswamy Iyer, a representative of Rukmini Devi Arundale, the founder of the fine arts college Kalakshetra. The young boys showed unusual musical and rhythmic talent, and were offered a thorough education in the Fine Arts. Lakshman's father was only too happy to accept the offer made by Kalakshetra.

== Early education and training ==
Adyar Lakshman began his education at Kalakshetra in 1944 at the age of 11 years. He underwent vigorous training in vocal music, Bharatha Natyam, Mridangam and Nattuvangam under the able tutelage of eminent teachers. He had the good fortune to receive his early training and exposure to the Classical arts from Smt. Rukmini Devi Arundale herself. He has also been closely associated with other great masters in the field, including Mylapore Gowri Ammal, K. N. Dandayudhapani Pillai, S. Saradha, Tiger Varadachari, Budalur Krishnamoorthy Sastrigal, T. K. Ramaswamy Iyengar, Mysore Vasudevacharya, Tanjore Rajagopala Iyer, V. Vital, Kamalarani, and Karaikudi Muthu Iyer. Eventually, he graduated in 1954 from Kalashetra in Bharatanatyam, Carnatic music and nattuvangam; though stayed on in Kalakshetra, and received a Government of India scholarship, and went on to receive a post-graduate diploma in 1956.

Thereafter he went on to specialise in mridangam and also learnt Kathakali from Ambu Panicker, and Chandu Panicker. Subsequently, he was cast by Rukmini Devi in prominent Kalakshetra productions like, "Kumara Sambhavam", "Kutrala Kuravanji", "Sita Swayamvaram" and "Usha Parinayam", based on the Melattur Bhagavata Mela tradition.

== Career ==
Lakshman's first ventured into teaching outside Kalakshetra in Vyjayantimala Bali's school, Natyalaya. Here over period of more than a decade, he conducted over ten arangetrams, assisted in productions like "Tiruppavai", "Azhagar Kuravanji", "Chandalika" and "Sanga Tamil Malai".

== Academy ==
Founded the Bharatha Choodamani Academy of Fine arts on 22 August 1969. He has trained a wide variety of dancers and many professionals and produced dance drama productions like "Varunapuri Kuravanji", "Aiychiar Kuravai," etc. He has also choreographed classical dance sequences in films like "Hamsa Geethe", "Subba Sastri" and "Ananda Tandavam".

== Awards ==
Adyar Lakshman has received several awards for his outstanding contribution to the art of Bharatha Nayam, as a dance guru, choreographer, composer and nattuvanar. He received the Padma Shri award from the president of India in 1989, and Sangeet Natak Akademi Award (Bharatnatyam) in 1991 by Sangeet Natak Akademi, India's National Academy of Music Dance & Drama.
