= Nieuwenhuizen =

Nieuwenhuizen is a Dutch surname meaning "new houses". A great number of variant forms exist (see the most common form Nieuwenhuis). Notable people with such surname include:

- Anneloes Nieuwenhuizen (born 1963), Dutch field hockey defender
- Annet Nieuwenhuijzen (1930–2016), Dutch theater and television actress
- Antonius van Nieuwenhuizen (1879–1957), Dutch fencer
- Cora van Nieuwenhuizen (born 1963), Dutch VVD politician
- Dick Nieuwenhuizen (born 1957), Dutch water polo player
- Frederik Nicolaas Nieuwenhuijzen (1819–1892), Dutch colonial administrator in the Dutch East Indies
- James Nieuwenhuizen (born 2004), Australian soccer goalkeeper
- Jan Nieuwenhuizen (born 1968), Dutch programmer, co-creator of Lilypond
- Jan Nieuwenhuyzen (1724–1806), Dutch Mennonite founder of the Maatschappij tot Nut van 't Algemeen
- Jörg van Nieuwenhuijzen (born 1978), Dutch football goalkeeper
- Kees van Nieuwenhuizen (1884–1981), Dutch footballer
- Ludwin Van Nieuwenhuyze (born 1978), Belgian football defender
- Peter van Nieuwenhuizen (born 1938), Dutch theoretical physicist, co-discoverer of supergravity
- Pieter van Nieuwenhuyzen (born 1971), Dutch competitive sailor
- Richard Nieuwenhuizen (1971–2012), Dutchman fatally injured by a youth football team
- Tom van den Nieuwenhuijzen (born 1982), Dutch politician
- Walter van Nieuwenhuisen (died 1797), Dutch Old Catholic Archbishop of Utrecht
- Wilhelm Christiaan Nieuwenhuijzen (1847–1913), Dutch colonel in the Royal Netherlands East Indies Army

== See also ==
- Nieuwenhuis, surname of the same origin
- Nienhuis, surname of the same origin
- Nijenhuis, surname of the same origin
