= Nijhuis =

Nijhuis is a Dutch toponymic surname. It is a form of Nieuwenhuis ("new house") originating in the Twente region of Overijssel. Notable people with the surname include:

- Alfred Nijhuis (born 1966), Dutch football defender
- Bas Nijhuis (born 1977), Dutch football referee
- Jos Nijhuis (born 1957), Dutch businessman, CEO of Schiphol Group 2009 – 2018
- Michelle Nijhuis (born 1974), American science journalist
- Moniek Nijhuis (born 1988), Dutch breaststroke swimmer
- Rudi Nijhuis (born c. 1950), drummer in the band Teach-In
- Thijmen Nijhuis (born 1998), Dutch football goalkeeper
- Thijs Nijhuis (born 1992), Dutch-born Danish long-distance runner

== See also ==
- Nijenhuis, Niehues, Nienhuis, different forms of the same surname
- Ryan Nyhuis (born 1996), Australian rules footballer
- Albert Neuhuys (1844–1914), Dutch painter
- Willem Gerard van Nouhuys (1854–1914), Dutch playwright
