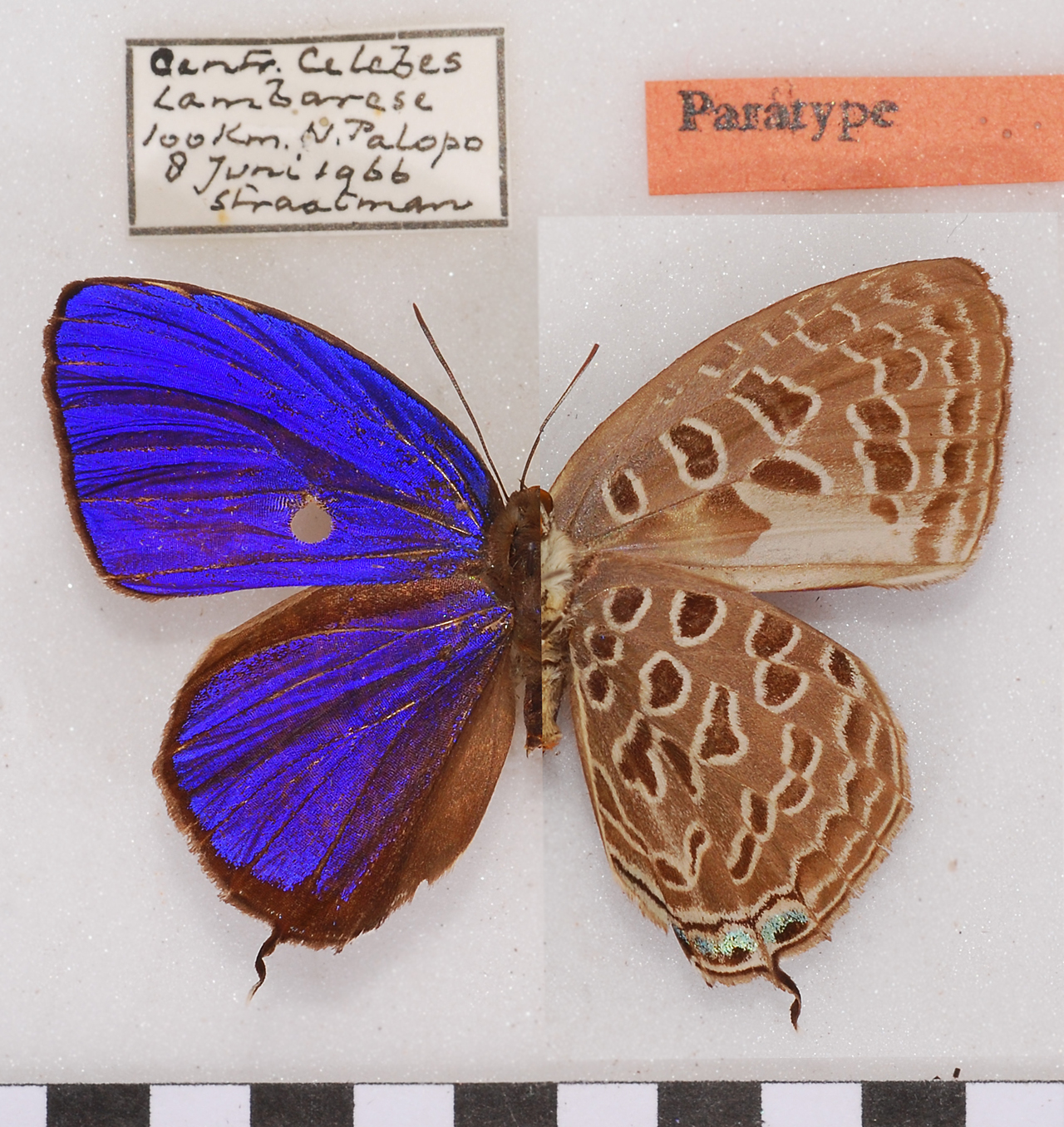
- Arhopala straatmani

Scientific classification
- Kingdom: Animalia
- Phylum: Arthropoda
- Class: Insecta
- Order: Lepidoptera
- Family: Lycaenidae
- Subfamily: Theclinae
- Tribe: Arhopalini
- Genus: Arhopala
- Species: A. straatmani

Binomial name
- Arhopala straatmani Nieuwenhuis, 1969

= Arhopala straatmani =

Straatman's oakblue

Species of butterfly

Arhopala straatmani, the Straatman's oakblue, is a butterfly in the family Lycaenidae. It was discovered by Engbert Jan Nieuwenhuis in 1969. It is found in Sulawesi.
