= Bharatanatyam =

Major form of Indian classical dance

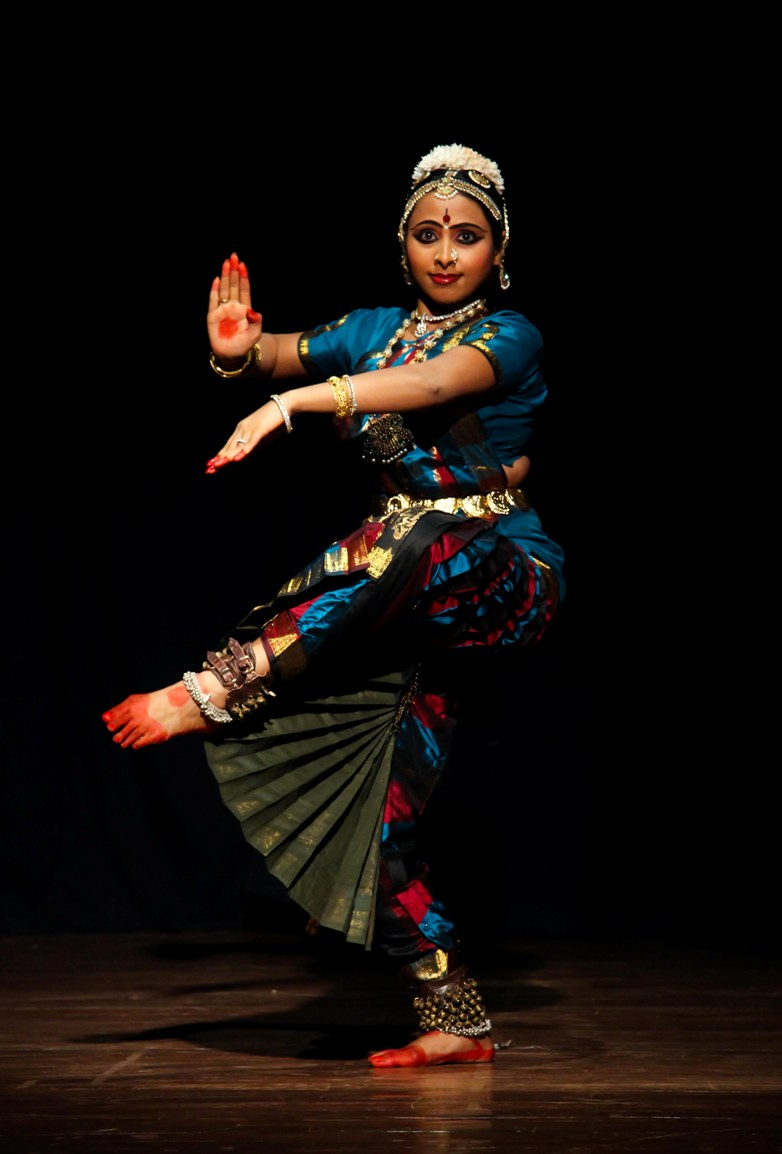
- Genre: Indian classical dance
- Origin: Tamil Nadu, India

Bharatanatyam is an Indian classical dance form that comes from Kerala Tamil Nadu, India. It is a classical dance form recognized by the Sangeet Natak Akademi, and expresses South Indian religious themes and spiritual ideas, particularly of Shaivism and in general of Hinduism. It is performed for Nataraja, the god of dance.

A description of the precursors of Bharatanatyam from the Natya Shastra dates from around 500 BCE to 500 CE, while those in the ancient Tamil epic Silappatikaram date to around 171 CE. Temple sculptures of the 6th to 9th centuries CE suggest dance was a refined performance art by the mid-1st millennium CE. Sadiraattam, which was renamed Bharatanatyam in 1932, is the oldest classical dance tradition in India.

Bharatanatyam contains different types of bani. Bani, or "tradition", is a term used to describe the dance technique and style specific to a guru or school, often named after the village of the guru. The Bharatanatyam style is noted for its fixed upper torso, bent legs, and flexed knees (aramandi) combined with footwork, and a vocabulary of sign language based on gestures of hands, eyes, and facial muscles. The dance is accompanied by music and a singer, and typically the dancer's guru is present as the nattuvanar, or director-conductor of the performance and art. The performance repertoire of Bharatanatyam, like that of other classical dances, includes nrita (pure dance), nritya (conveys a meaning to the audience through hand gestures) and natya (consists of the elements of drama). A program of Bharatanatyam usually lasts two hours without interruption and includes a specific list of procedures, all performed by one dancer, who does not leave the stage or change costumes. The accompanying orchestra—composed of drums, drone, and a singer—occupies the back of the stage, led by the guru, or teacher, of the dancer.

Sadiraattam remained exclusive to Tamil Hindu temples through the 19th century. It was banned by the colonial British government in 1910, but the Indian community protested against the ban and expanded its performance outside temples in the 20th century as Bharatanatyam. Modern stage productions of Bharatanatyam have become popular throughout India and include performances that are purely dance-based, featuring non-religious ideas and fusion themes. The Thanjavur Quartet developed the basic structure of modern Bharatanatyam by formalizing it.

== Etymology ==
The word Bharata is seen as a backronym, with bha standing for bhavam (feelings, emotions), ra for ragam (melody, framework for musical notes), and ta for talam (rhythm). The term Natyam is a Sanskrit word (Sanskrit: नाट्यम्) for "dance". The compound word Bharatanatyam, therefore, is understood to connote a dance that harmoniously expresses bhavam, ragam and talam. Other interpretations suggest that the name literally translates to "the dance of Bharata", from Bharata, who is reputed to be the author of the Natya Shastra, a Sanskrit text of performance arts.

In 1932, E Krishna Iyer and Rukmini Devi Arundale proposed renaming Sadiraattam (Tamil: சதிராட்டம்), also known as Parathaiyar Aattam or Thevarattam, as Bharatanatyam to give the dance form a measure of respect, at a meeting of the Madras Music Academy. They also were instrumental in modifying mainly the Pandanallur style of dance.

== History ==
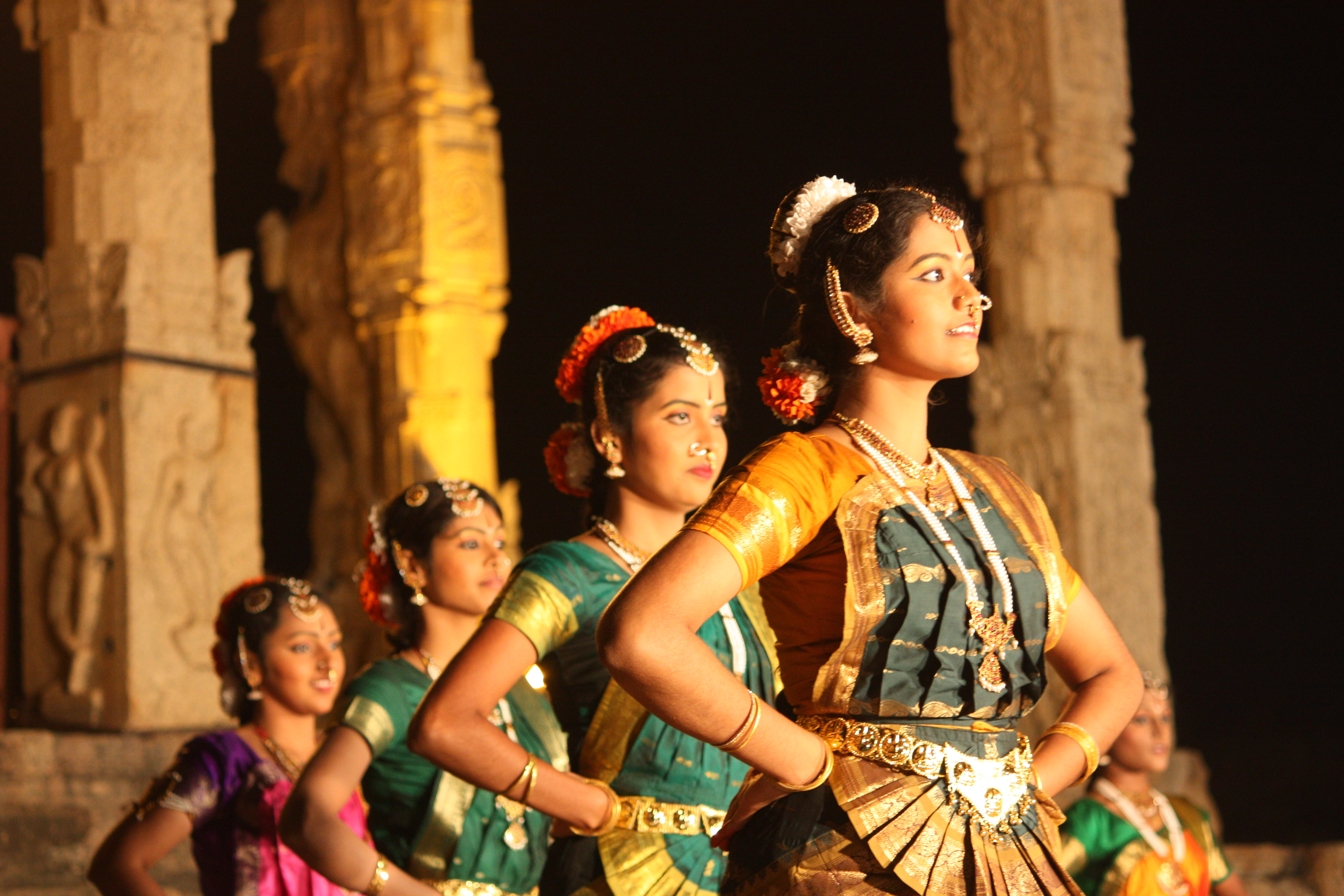
Dancers at Thanjavur, Brihadeshwara temple dedicated to Shiva. The temple has been a center for dance since about 1000 CE.

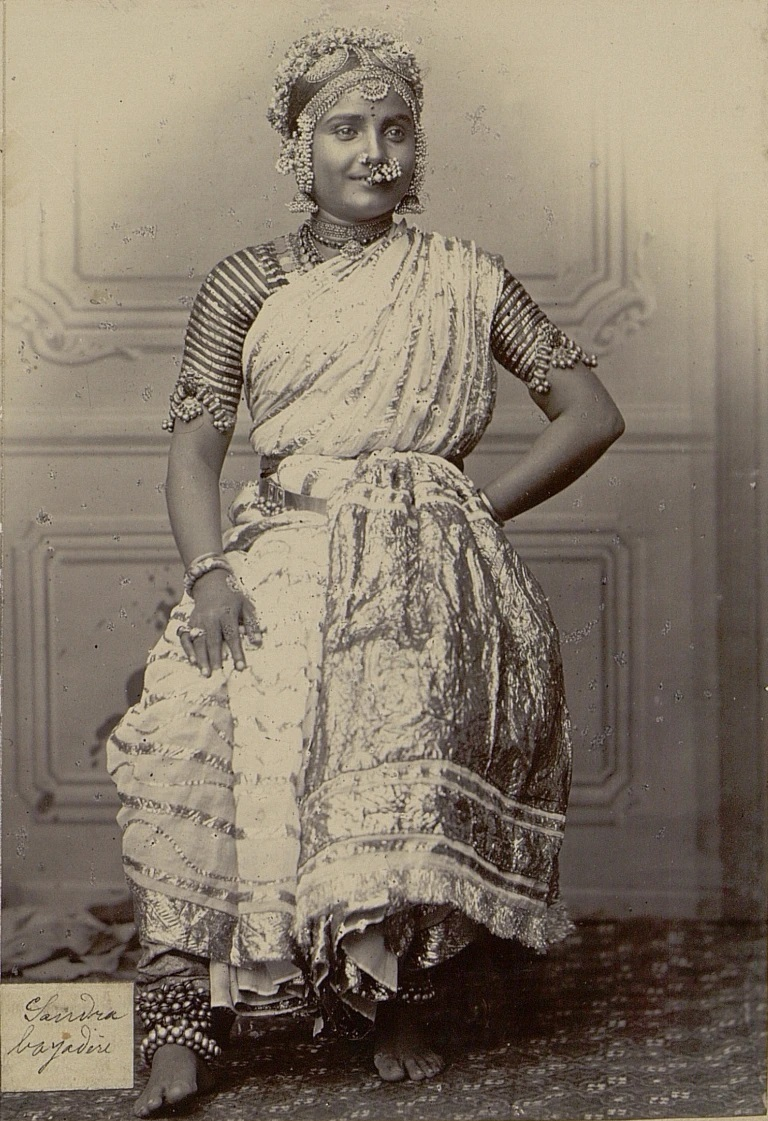
Notable Sadir dancer Gnyana of Tanjore, 19th century.

The theoretical foundations of the dance Bharatanatyam are found first in the Natya Shastra and later in a Tamil text called Kootha nool taken from the Tholkappiyam (250 BCE).

The first complete compilation of the Natya Shastra is dated to between 500 BCE and 200 CE, though estimates vary between 500 BCE and 500 CE. Richmond et al. estimate the Natasutras to have been composed around 600 BCE. The most studied version of the Natya Shastra text consists of about 6,000 verses structured into 36 chapters. The text, states Natalia Lidova, describes the theory of Tāṇḍava dance (Shiva), the theory of rasa, of bhāva, expression, gestures, acting techniques, basic steps, and standing postures—all of which are part of Indian classical dances. Dance and performance arts, states this text, are a form of expression for spiritual ideas, virtues, and the essence of scriptures.

Historical references to dance are found in the Tamil epics Silappatikaram (c. 2nd century CE) and Manimegalai (c. 6th century CE). The ancient text Silappatikaram includes a story of a dancing girl named Madhavi; it describes the Madhavi's dance training regimen, called Arangatrau Kathai, in verses 113 through 159. The carvings in Kanchipuram's Shiva temple that have been dated to the 6th to 9th centuries CE suggest dance was a well-developed performance art by about the mid-1st millennium CE.

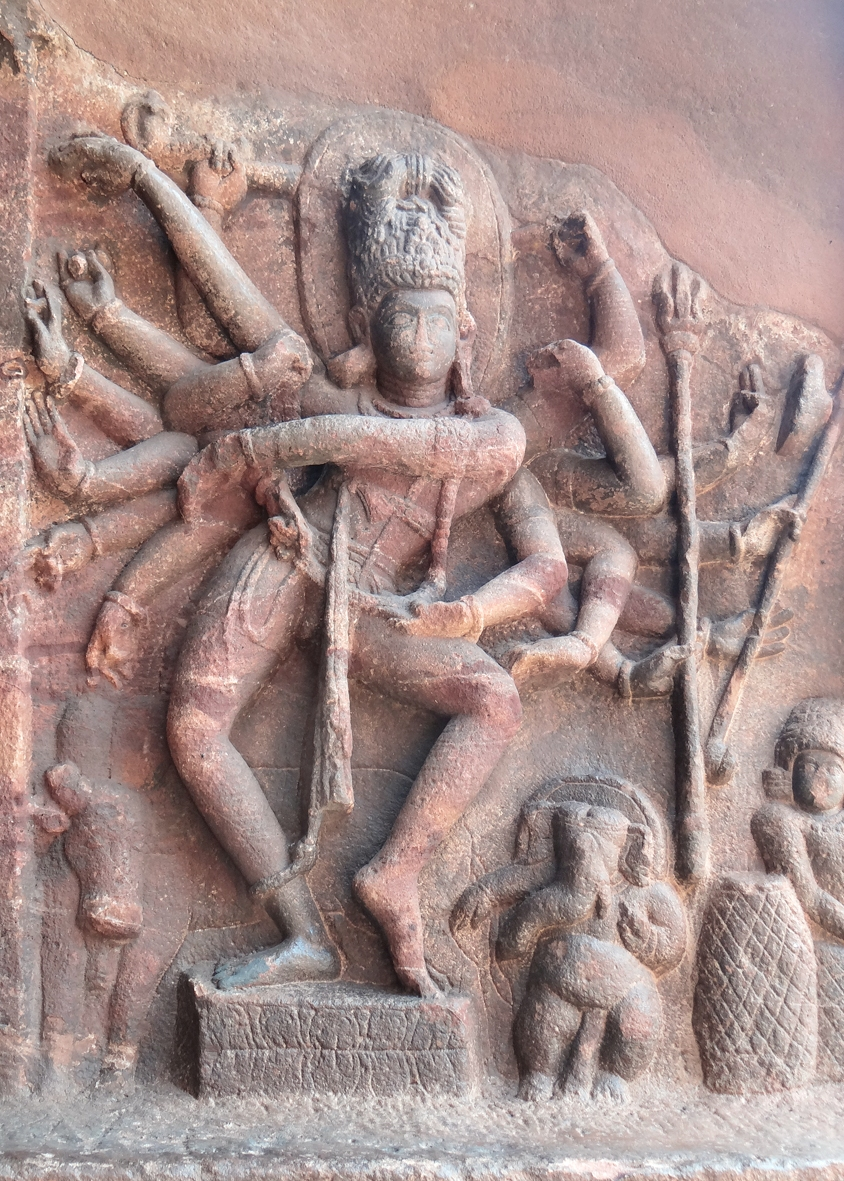
A 7th-century Shiva in Karnataka

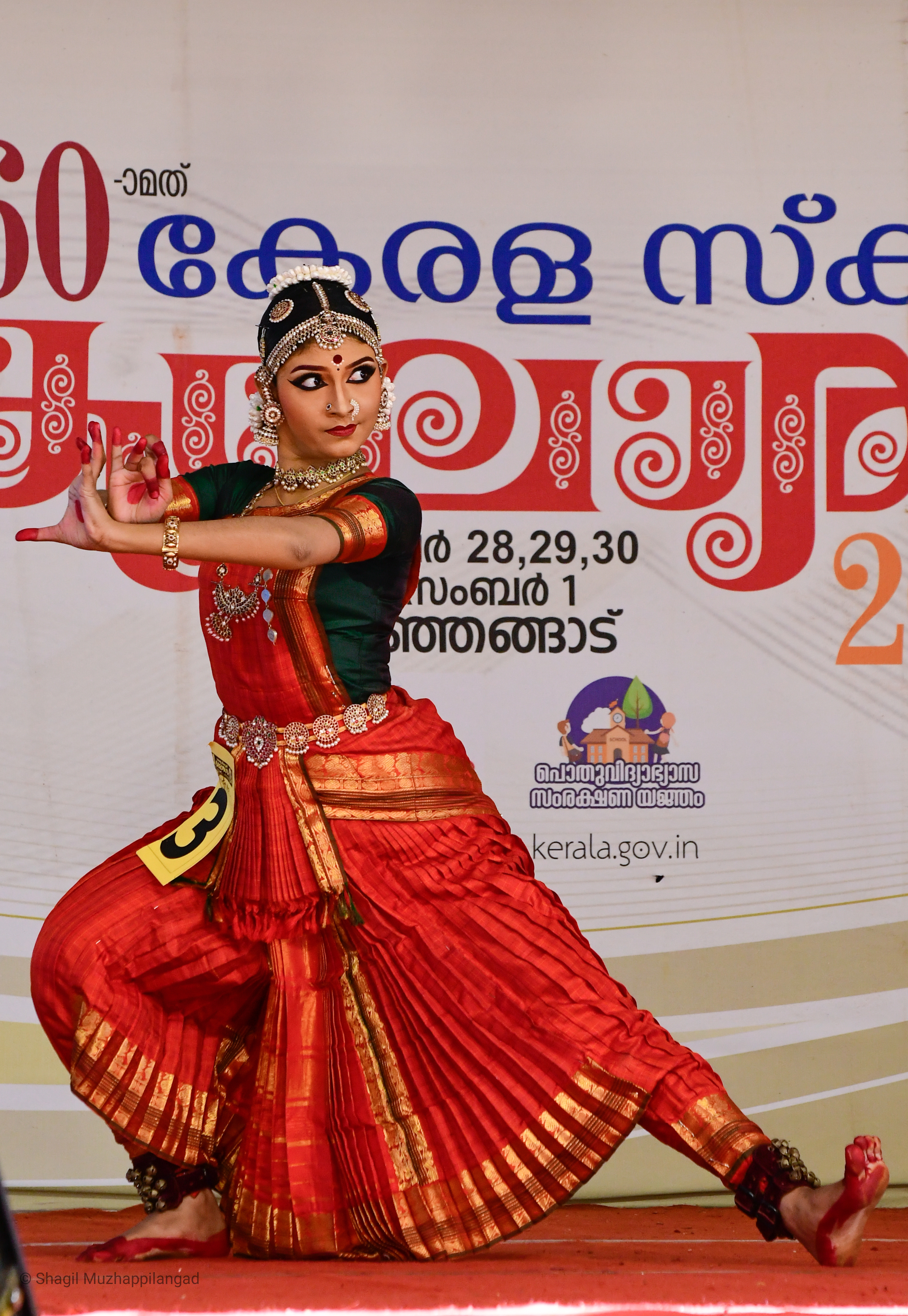
A Bharatanatyam pose

Dance helped inspire musicians, poets, painters, singers, and sculptors in Indian history.

A famous example of illustrative sculpture is in the southern gateway of the Chidambaram temple (c. 12th century) dedicated to the Hindu god Shiva, where 108 poses, described as karanas in the Natya Shastra, are carved in stone.

Bharatanatyam shares the dance poses of many ancient Shiva sculptures in Hindu temples. The image, 5 feet (1.5 m) tall, has 18 arms in a form that expresses the dance positions arranged in a geometric pattern. The arms of Shiva express mudras (symbolic hand gestures), that are used in Bharatanatyam. The early 12th-century Sanskrit text Manasollasa discusses dance movements such as Natya, Tandava, Lasya, Laghu, Visama, and Vikata. This discussion is similar to the content found in Natya Shastra.

=== Devadasis, anti-dance movement, colonial ban, and the decline ===
Some colonial Indologists and modern authors have argued that Bharatanatyam is a descendant of an ancient Devadasi (lit. 'servant girls of Devas') culture, suggesting a historical origin dating back to between 300 BCE and 300 CE. Modern scholars have questioned this theory due to a lack of any direct textual or archaeological evidence. Historical sculptures and texts do describe and project dancing girls, as well as temple quarters dedicated to women, but they do not describe them to as courtesans and prostitutes, as alleged by early colonial Indologists. According to Davesh Soneji, a critical examination of evidence suggests that courtesan dancing is a phenomenon of the modern era, beginning in the late 16th or the 17th century during the Nayaka period of Tamil Nadu. According to James Lochtefeld, classical dance remained exclusive to Hindu temples through the 19th century, appearing on stage outside temples only in the 20th century. Further, the Thanjavur Maratha kingdom patronized classical dance.

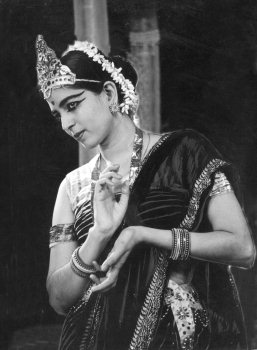
Rukmini Devi Arundale, pictured in 1940, proposed Bharatanatyam after Hindu temple dancing was banned by the British colonial government in 1910.

With the arrival of the East India Company in the 18th century, and British colonial rule in the 19th, classical Indian dance forms were ridiculed and discouraged, and these performance arts declined. Christian missionaries and British officials presented "nautch girls" of north India (Kathak) and "devadasis" of south India (Bharatanatyam) as evidence of a "harlots, debased erotic culture, slavery to idols and priests" tradition. The Christian missionaries demanded that this be stopped, launching the "anti-dance movement" in 1892. The anti-dance camp accused the dance form of being a front for prostitution, while revivalists questioned these constructed colonial histories.

In 1910, the Madras Presidency of the British Empire banned temple dancing, and with it the classical dance tradition in Hindu temples.

The banning of temple dancing stemmed from the 1892 anti-dance movement and new, liberal colonial perspectives. The English saw Bharatnatyam as indecent, failing to fit their idea of 19th-century modernity. Adopting a deep orientalist perspective, colonial authorities called into question the morality of people who performed Bharatanatyam. Accusations of prostitution were thrown around. Some women from traditionally performing communities were used to exemplify alleged obscenity. New reforms disregarded local issues such as artistic production for the sake of liberalism, imposing disruptive reforms that reshaped lives at all levels and subjected people to new standards. Colonial reforms were largely unsympathetic to local traditions and dismissive of the industry surrounding art production. Anglo-Indian laws imposed certain restrictions and regulations on certain expressions of sexuality—and on bodies and sex in general—which in turn affected traditional dance practices. Advocates of multiple political agendas targeting temple dancing, seeking to shape this burgeoning morality issue to suit their causes. Colonial denunciations of the practice of temple dancing were caught up in liberal ideals of bringing modernity to India, where modernity was tied to Anglo-Protestant moral ideas about how bodies are viewed and how sexuality is presented.

=== Post-colonial revival ===
The 1910 ban triggered protests against the stereotyping and dehumanization of temple dancers. The Tamil people were concerned that a historical and rich dance tradition was being victimized under the guise of social reform. Classical art revivalists such as E. Krishna Iyer, a lawyer who had learned from traditional practitioners of Sadir, questioned the cultural discrimination and the assumed connection, asking why prostitution would require years of training in the performance arts, and how killing performance arts could end any evils in society. Iyer, who was arrested and sentenced to prison on charges of nationalism, persuaded his fellow political prisoners to support Bharatanatyam while serving his prison term.

While the British colonial government enforced laws to suppress Hindu temple dances, some from the West, such as the American dancer Esther Sherman, who moved to India in 1930, learned Indian classical dances, and changed her name to Ragini Devi, joined the movement to revive Bharatanatyam and other ancient dance arts.

The Indian independence movement in the early 20th century, already in progress, became a period of cultural ferment and initiated an effort by the people to reclaim their culture and rediscover their history. In this period of cultural and political turmoil, Bharatanatyam was revived as a mainstream dance outside of Hindu temples by artists such as Rukmini Devi Arundale, Balasaraswati and Yamini Krishnamurti. They championed and performed the Pandanallur and Thanjavur styles of Bharatanatyam.

Nationalist movements that focussed on revitalizing devadasis viewed the issue as a way to critique the imposition of colonial morality on India. However, the revival movement was not without Western influence. These movements were influenced by Western ideas regarding the democratization of the arts, striving to make dance accessible to more people. Such revivalist movements were also influenced by Western ideology in asserting that the movement was both a reassertion of traditional values and a moment to remind people of the country's cultural heritage and re-establish a sense of identity. Fighting for freedom from the British and fighting for civil liberties included debates about morality, and how gender impacts it. The revival movement moralized devadasis by democratizing the art, while also decorating it with the female performing class. Figures such as Rukmini Devi Arundale, who is credited with revitalizing Bharatanatyam, also shifted the practice to appeal to middle- and upper-class women. Rukmini Devi Arundale is also credited with helping develop the Kalakshetra style of Bharatanatyam. An emphasis on building a modern India through Indian nationalism tied into protecting artistic traditions. The decommercialization and sanitation of Bharatanatyam to protect the spirit of the art were central to its revival. Bharatanatyam's successful revival meant that it came to be regarded as a classical dance tradition specific to India, as opposed to a cultural dance that had been changed by colonial censorship. Having a nationally recognized traditional dance that was practised recreationally became a hallmark of a modern nation. With the standardization of Bharatanatyam, books emerged based on historical texts, such as the Natya Shastra, which described the different movements. Evidence of a successful revival movement via Indian Nationalist movements was the introduction of state-sponsored dance festivals in 1955 in independent India. These festivals were established to display art with religious, social, and cultural connotations reflecting regional diversity on a common national platform.

In the late 20th century, Tamil Hindu migrants reintroduced the traditions of temple dancing in British Tamil temples.

== Elements ==
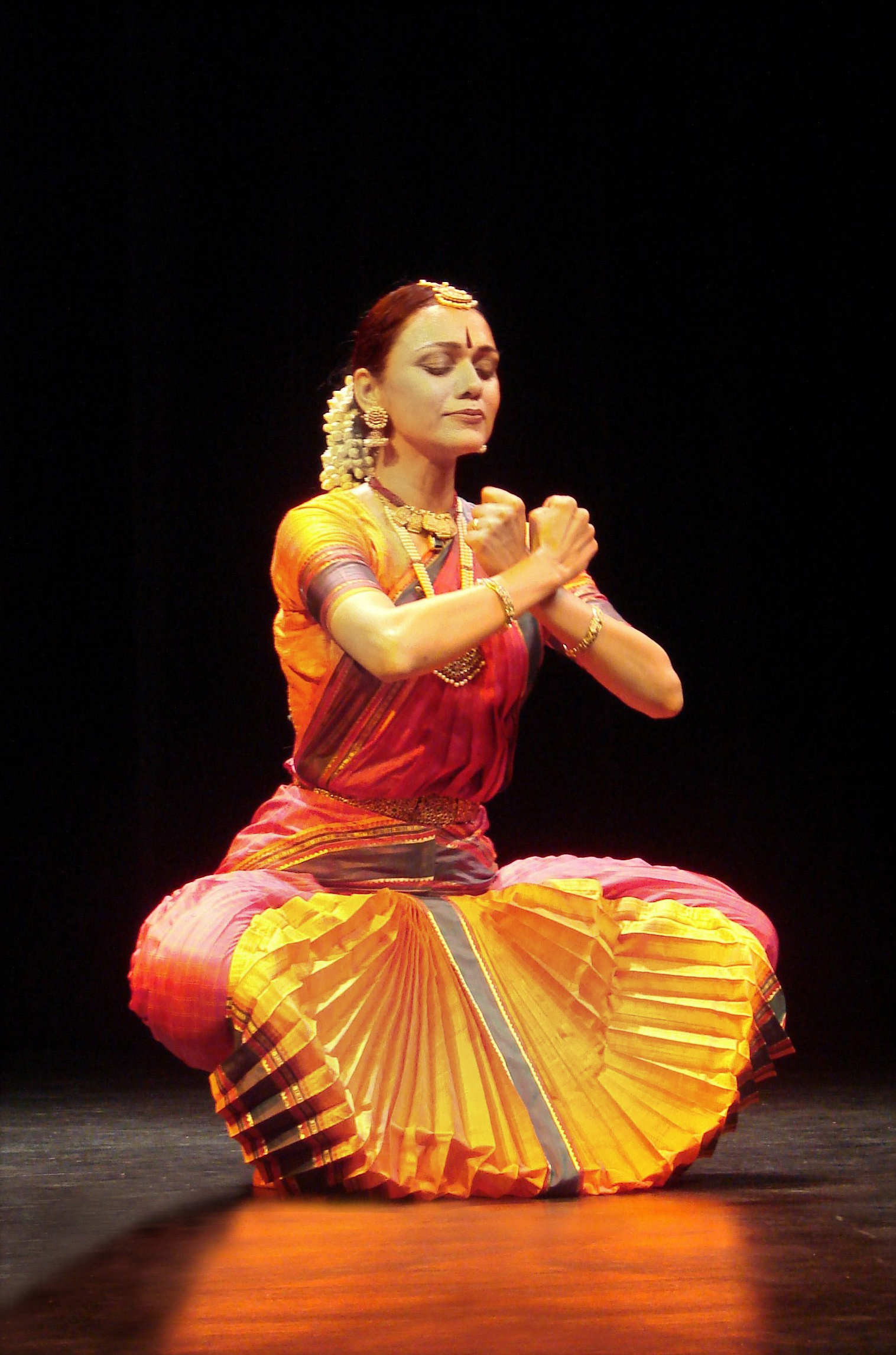
Rama Vaidyanathan using expression and posture

Bharatanatyam is traditionally a team performance art that consists of a solo dancer, accompanied by musicians and one or more singers. It is described as a classical art because the theory of musical notes, vocal performance, and dance movement reflects ideas from the Sanskrit treatise Natya Shastra and other Sanskrit and Tamil texts, such as the Abhinaya Darpana.

The solo artist (ekaharya) in Bharatanatyam is dressed in a colourful sari, adorned with jewellery, and presents a dance that is synchronized with Indian classical music. The hand and facial gestures are a coded sign language able to express legends and spiritual ideas from the Mahabharata, the Ramayana, the Puranas, and historical drama texts. The dancer deploys turns or specific body movements to mark punctuation in the story or the entry of a different character in the play or legend being acted out through dance. Abhinaya is the art of expression in Indian aesthetics; footwork, body language, postures, musical notes, the tones of the vocalist, aesthetics, and costumes integrate to express and communicate the underlying text.

In modern adaptations, Bharatanatyam dance troupes may involve many dancers who play specific characters in a story, creatively choreographed to facilitate interpretation and enhance the audience's experience.

The repertoire of Bharatanatyam, like that of all major classical Indian dance forms, follows the three categories of performance in the Natya Shastra. These are Nritta (Nirutham), Nritya (Niruthiyam) and Natya (Natyam).

The purpose
Bharata Natyam is an art which consecrates the body (...)
the dancer, who dissolves her identity in rhythm and music, makes her body an instrument, at least for the duration of the dance, for the experience and expression of the spirit.
The traditional order of Bharata Natyam recital viz. alarippu, jatiswaram, kauthuvam, varnam, padams, ashtapadi,tillana and the shloka is the correct sequence in the practice of this art, which is an artistic Yoga, for revealing the spiritual through the corporeal.

— Balasaraswati, a devadasi
- The Nritta performance is an abstract, fast, and rhythmic aspect of the dance. The viewer is presented with pure movement in Bharatanatyam, wherein the emphasis is on the beauty in motion, form, speed, range, and pattern. This part of the repertoire has no interpretive aspect and no story to tell. It is a technical performance that aims to engage the senses (Prakriti) of the audience.
- The Nritya is a slower and more expressive aspect of the dance that attempts to communicate feelings and storylines, particularly those with spiritual themes in Hindu dance traditions. In a nritya, the dance-acting expands to include the silent expression of words through gestures and body motion set to musical notes. The actor articulates a legend or a spiritual message. This part of the Bharatanatyam repertoire is more than sensory enjoyment; it aims to engage the emotions and mind of the viewer.
- The Natyam is a play, typically a team performance, though it can be acted out by a solo performer where the dancer uses certain standardized body movements to indicate a new character in the underlying story. A Natya incorporates the elements of a Nritya.

=== Arangetram ===
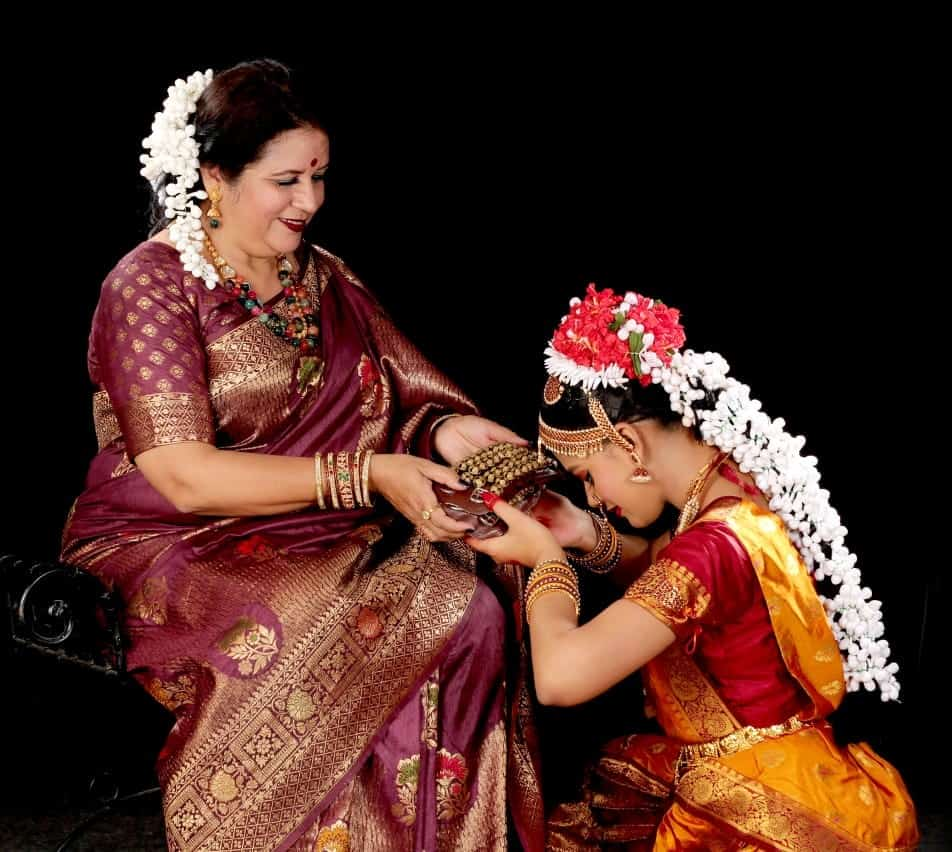
Bharatanatyan student with guru in Arangetram ceremony

A Bharatanatyam arangetram is a solo debut performance that signifies the completion of the initial formal training of a young dancer—female or male—in Indian classical dance. The term arangetram translates to "ascending the stage". This performance is typically done ten to twelve years after a dancer begins learning Bharatanatyam. More importantly, it is done when the guru believes the student is ready for a solo performance. This solo debut is synonymous with a "coming-of-age" celebration. The arangetram is the culmination of multiple years of hard work by the student and the guru, and it is an opportunity for the dancer to showcase their dedication and skills developed over the years. Throughout this debut, the dancer performs a series of dances. The dancer must build up concentration and stamina to perform solo dances for approximately three hours. Each dance performed symbolizes various aspects of the Hindu religion.

==== Sequence of dances ====
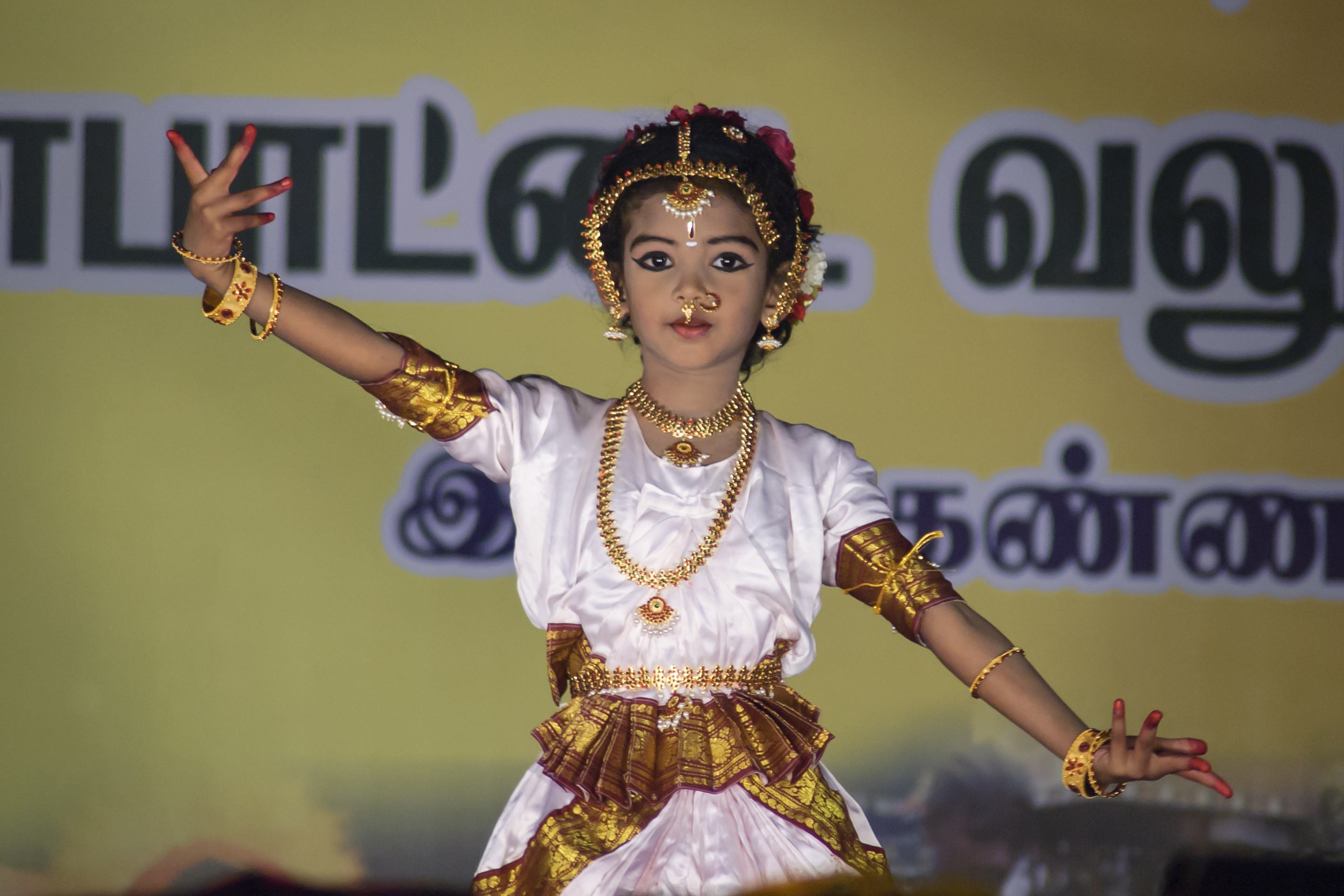
A girl performing a Bharatanatyam dance at a Pongal Festival in Namakkal, Tamil Nadu, India

A traditional Bharatanatyam arangetram dance performance follows a seven- to eight-part order of presentation. This set is called margam.

Pushpanjali

The arangetram performance typically begins with a dance called the Pushpanjali, which translates to "offering of flowers". In this dance, the performer offers flowers and salutations to the Hindu deities, the guru, and the audience as a mark of respect. The beginning of the dance symbolizes supplication, from which the dancer then commences the rest of the performance.

Alarippu

The presentation can also begin with a rhythmic invocation (vandana) called the Alarippu. It is a pure dance, which combines a thank you and benediction for blessings from the gods and goddesses, the guru, and the gathered performance team. It also serves as a preliminary warm-up dance, without melody, to enable the dancer to loosen their body and journey away from distractions toward a single-minded focus.

Jatiswaram

The next stage of the performance adds melody to the movement of Alarippu, and this is called Jatiswaram. The dance remains a preliminary technical performance (nritta), pure in form and without any expressed words. The drums set the beat of a Carnatic music raga (melody). The dancer and musicians perform a sequence (korvai) to the rhythm of the beat, presenting to the audience the unity of music, rhythm, and movement.

Shabdam

The performance sequence then adds Shabdam (expressed words). This is the first item of margam where expressions are introduced. The solo dancer, the vocalist(s), and the musical team, in this stage of the production, present short compositions with words and meanings across a spectrum of moods. This performance praises deities (such as Krishna, Shiva, Rama, and Murugan) and their qualities.

Varnam

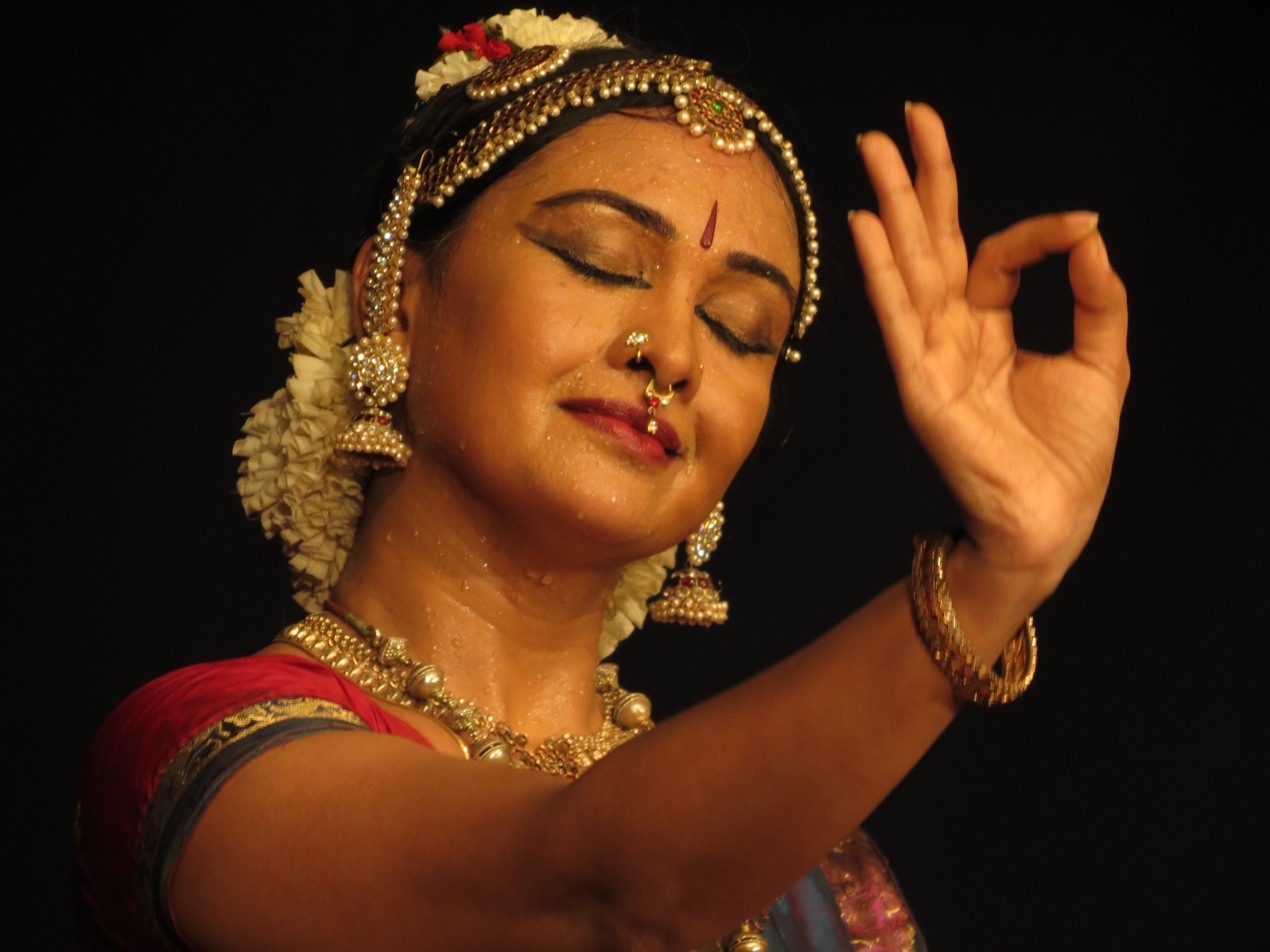
The Varnam part of Bharatanatyam emphasizes expressive dance.

The performance thereafter evolves into the Varnam stage. This marks the arrival into the sanctum sanctorum core of the performance. It is the longest section and the nritya. A traditional Varnam may be as long as 30–45 minutes, or sometimes an hour. Varnam offers huge scope for improvisation, and an experienced dancer can stretch it to a desirable length. The artist presents the play or the main composition, revelling in all their movements, silently communicating the text through codified gestures and footwork, harmoniously aligned with rhythmically punctuated music. The dancer performs complicated moves, such as expressing a verse at two speeds. The dancer's hands and body tell a story, whether of love and longing or of a battle between good and evil, as the musicians envelop the dancer with musical notes and tones that set the appropriate mood.

Padam

The Padam is next. This is the stage of reverence, simplicity, and abhinaya (expression) of a solemn spiritual message or devotional religious prayer (bhakti). The music is lighter, the chant intimate, and the dance emotional. The choreography attempts to express rasa (emotional taste) and a mood, while the recital may include items such as a keertanam (expressing devotion), a javali (expressing divine love) or other devotional pieces.

Tillana

The performance sequence ends with a Tillana, the climax. It closes out the nritya portion; the movements exit the temple of expressive dance, returning to the nritta style, where a series of pure movements and music are rhythmically performed. With this, the performance ends. (Note: After the Tillana, the dancer may continue to the seventh part, called Shloka. It is a reverential greeting, a thank you or a prayer to one or more gods, goddesses or to one's teacher. This is a post-performance, where a Sanskrit verse (Shloka) is danced out in the form of nritya. An example Shloka: "The Guru (teacher) is the Brahma, the Guru is the Vishnu, the Guru is the Maheshvara (Shiva). The Guru is the pathway to Supreme Brahman (supreme soul), to you the auspicious, I reverentially bow." Original: गुरुर्ब्रह्मा गुरुर्विष्णुर्गुरुर्देवो महेश्वरः । गुरुरेव परं ब्रह्म तस्मै श्रीगुरवे नमः ।।)

Shlokam or Mangalam

The seventh and final item in the sequence can be either a Shlokam or a Mangalam. The dancer calls for blessings on the people all around.

The overall sequence of Bharatanatyam, states Balasaraswati, thus moves from "mere meter; then melody and meter; continuing with music, meaning and meter; its expansion in the centerpiece of the varnam; thereafter, music and meaning without meter; [...] a non-metrical song at the end. We see a most wonderful completeness and symmetry in this art".

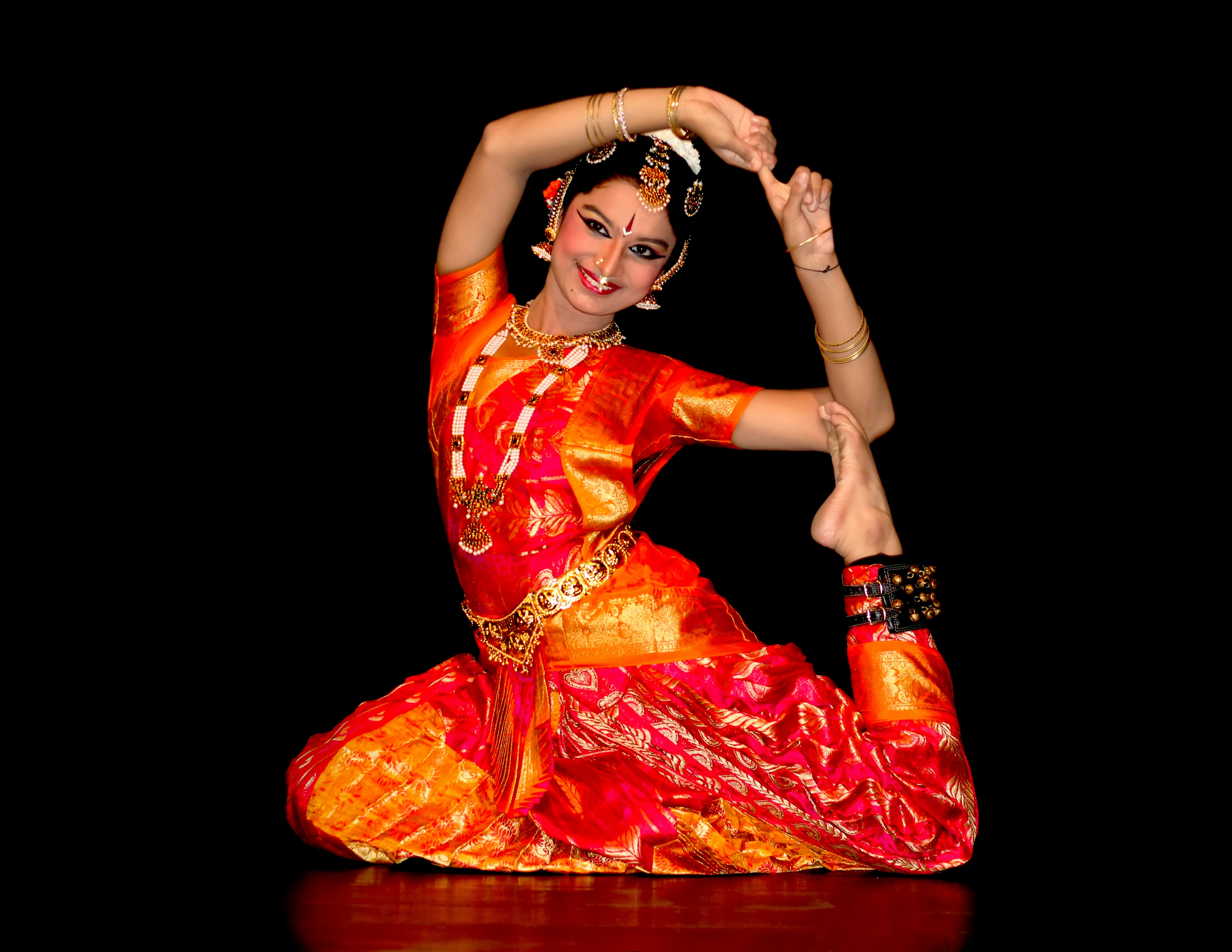
Costumes in Bharatanatyam

=== Costume and attire ===
The costume of a female Bharatanatyam dancer resembles a Tamil Hindu bridal dress. It typically consists of a sari in bright colors with golden or silver zari embroidery on the borders. The costume can be stitched from the sari, with individual pieces for a bottom (either a skirt or salwar-shaped pants), a pleated piece that falls in front and opens like a hand fan when the dancer flexes her knees or performs footwork, a hip piece that covers the seat of the pants or skirt, and a torso piece that looks like an aanchal (i.e., the draped part of a regular sari). Some dancers also opt for an unstitched sari that is draped specially, with the single piece of cloth starting around the legs like a dhoti, then running upwards along the front torso, over the left shoulder, and then down the back with its end held at the waist by a jeweled belt. The costume of a male Bharatanatyam dancer is usually a white cotton cloth draped around the legs and bottom half of the body like a dhoti. During performances, the upper body of the male dancer remains bare. Female dance attire consists of more accessories compared to male attire.

Female dancers wear elaborate jewelry such as earrings, nose rings, necklaces, bangles on their wrists, and additional jewelry on their heads that emphasizes their hairline and parting. They also wear a smaller piece of jewelry on each side of their parting. These represent the sun and the moon, symbolizing the duality of grace and strength, similar to those worn by brides in South India.

Long hair on female dancers is either secured in a bun or a braid. Female dancers with shorter hair often use braid extensions or bun hairpieces to simulate long hair. Female dancers also wear imitation flowers made of either cloth or paper around their braids or buns. These are known as gajra.

Dancers wear makeup, including foundation, blush, lipstick, and thick eyeliner or kohl, which helps the audience see and understand their facial expressions.

Bharatanatyam dancers wear leather anklets on each foot, which are called salangai or ghungroos. These are made of small bells attached to a broad leather strap with belts that secure them at the back of the ankle. The bells are arranged in uniform rows and can be heard when the dancer moves their feet. The salangai helps emphasize the rhythm of the music as well as the dancer's footwork. In addition to the salangai, it is also common for female dancers to wear silver anklets known as kolusu or payal on their feet.

Dancers outline their hands and feet with red kumkum powder or alta, a tradition that helps the audience easily see their hand and foot gestures.

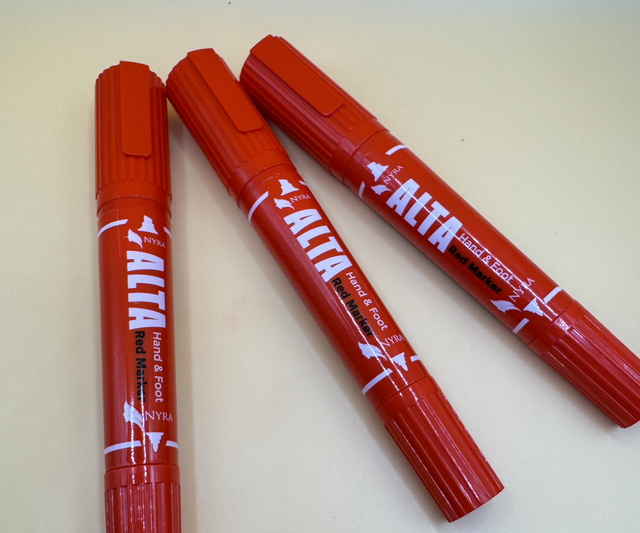
Nyra Alta Pen originally by Shanthi Tailors

For classes, training, practice, or rehearsals, dancers traditionally wear a special dance sari. These saris are always made of cotton and have a shorter breadth than normal saris, falling at the knees rather than the ankles. These are paired with cotton pyjamas and blouses. The sari is worn with pleats at the front and tied tightly around the torso and hips. However, in recent times, dancers also opt for salwar kameez or athletic wear (such as T-shirts and leggings) when not performing.

The accompanying music for Bharatanatyam is in the Carnatic style of South India, as are the recitation and chanting. The vocalist is called nattuvanar, typically also the conductor of the entire performance, who may be the guru of the dancer and may also play cymbals or another musical instrument. The recited verses and texts in Bharatanatyam are in Tamil and Sanskrit.

The instruments used include the mridangam (double-sided drum), nadaswaram (long type of oboe made from black wood), nattuvangam (cymbals), the flute, violin, and veena.

=== Symbolism ===
Bharatanatyam, like all classical dances of India, uses symbolism in its abhinaya (acting) and its goals. The roots of abhinaya appear in the Natya Shastra text, which defines drama in verse 6.10 as something that aesthetically arouses joy in the spectator, through the medium of the actor's art of communication, helping to connect and transport the individual into a sensual inner state of being. A performance art, asserts the Natya Shastra, connects the artists and the audience through abhinaya (literally, "carrying to the spectators")—that is, by applying body, speech, mind, and scene—wherein the actors communicate to the audience through song and music. Drama in this ancient Sanskrit text is thus is an art that engages every aspect of life to glorify and impart a state of joyful consciousness.

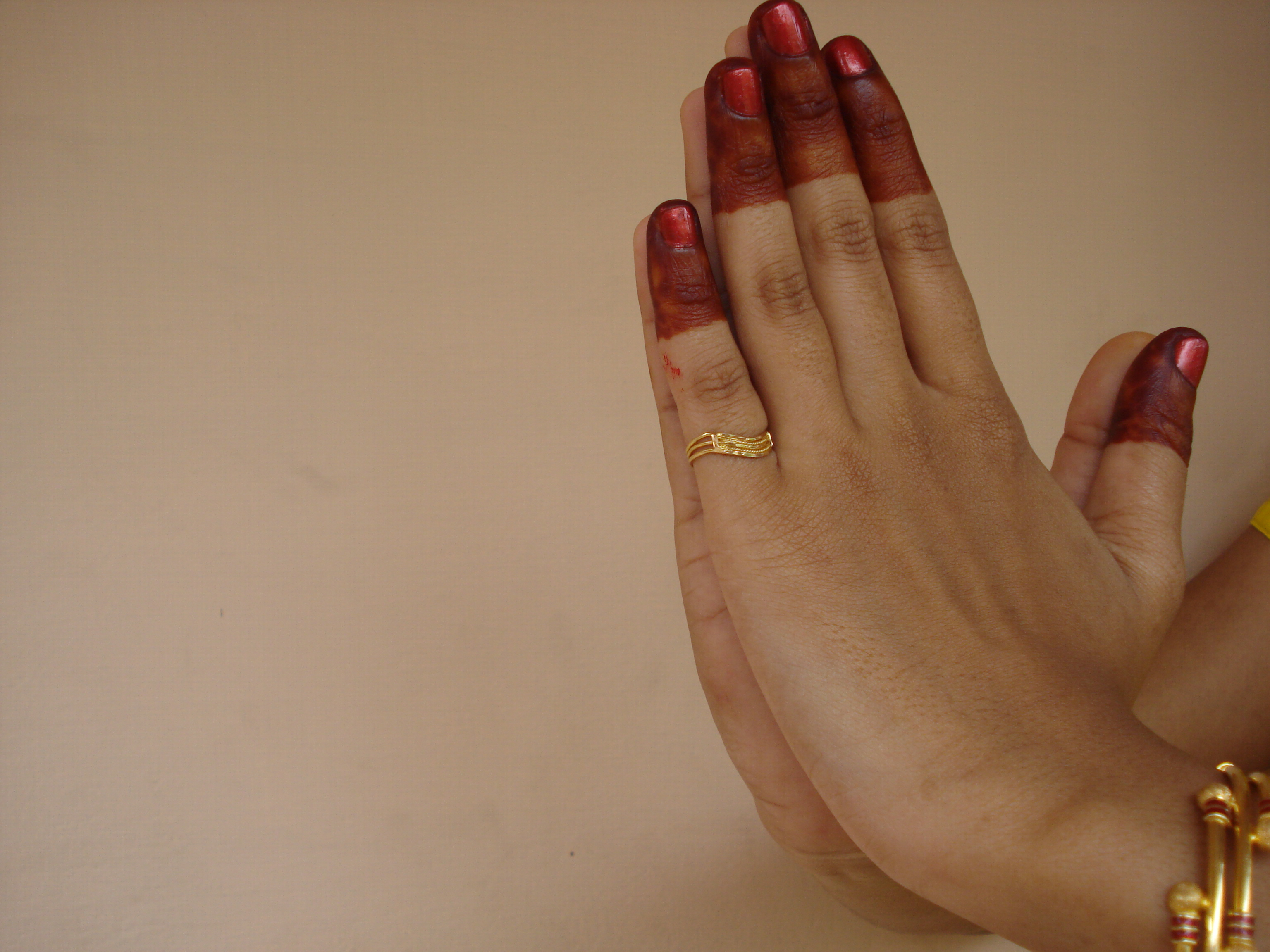
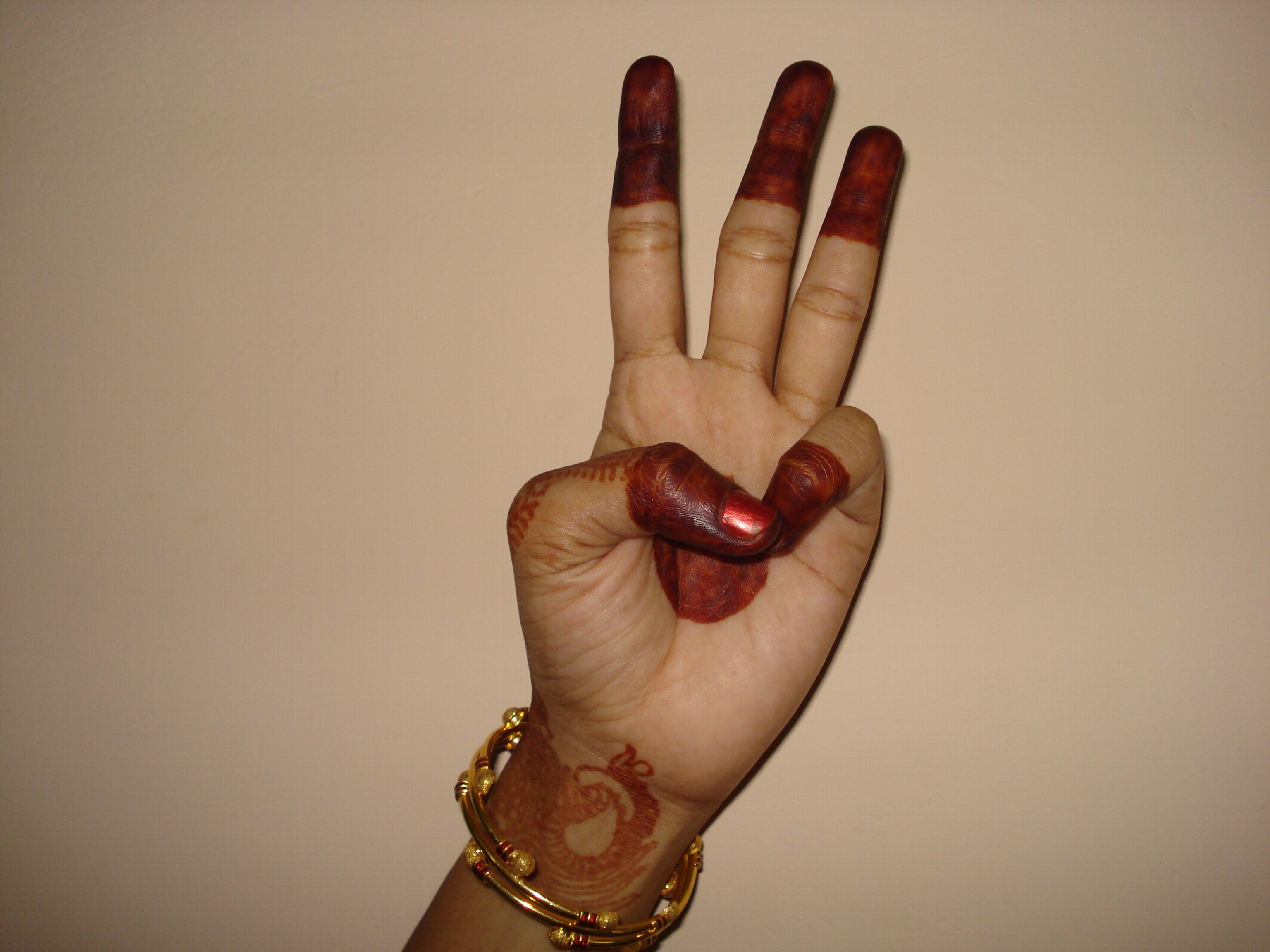
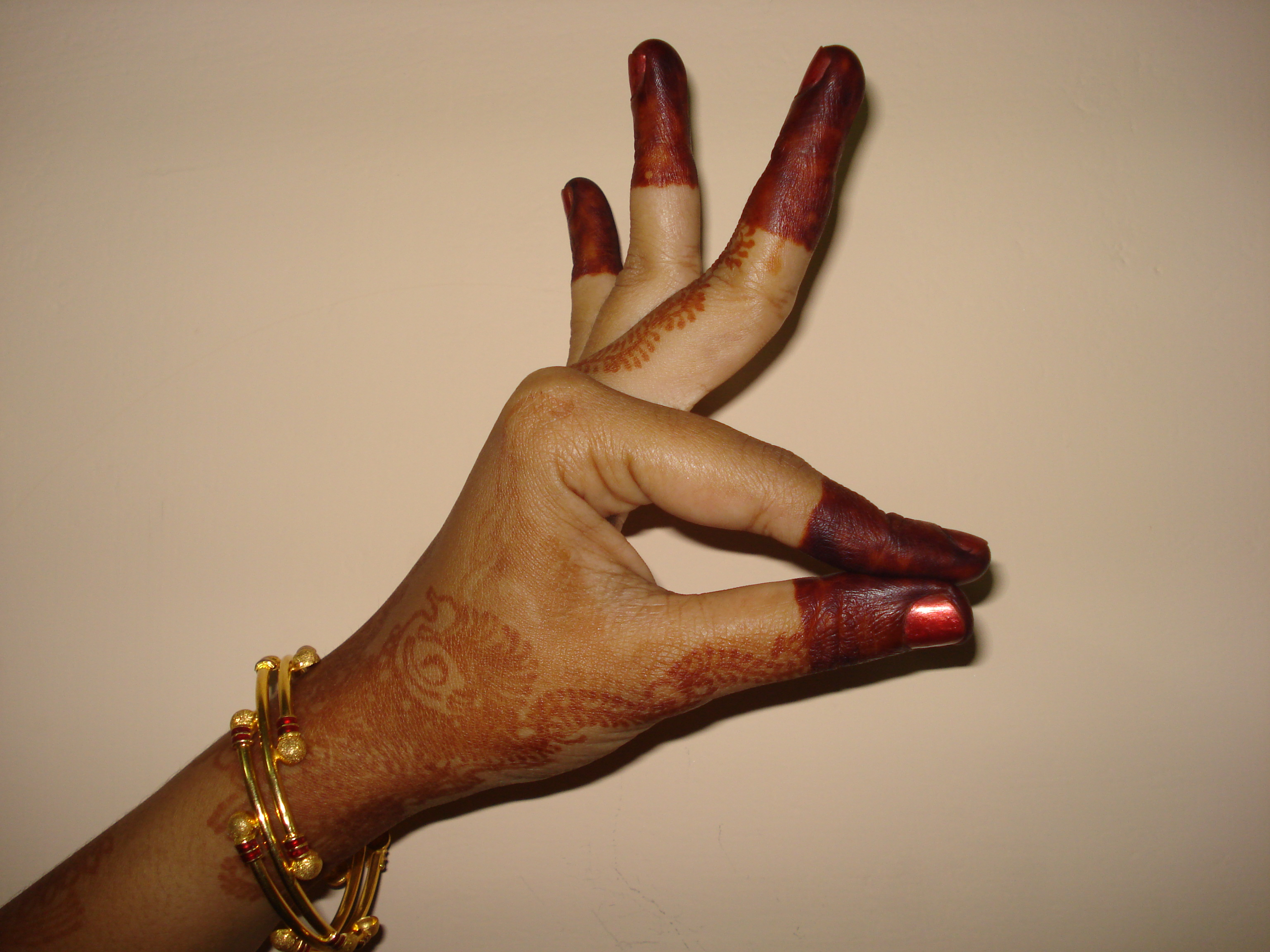
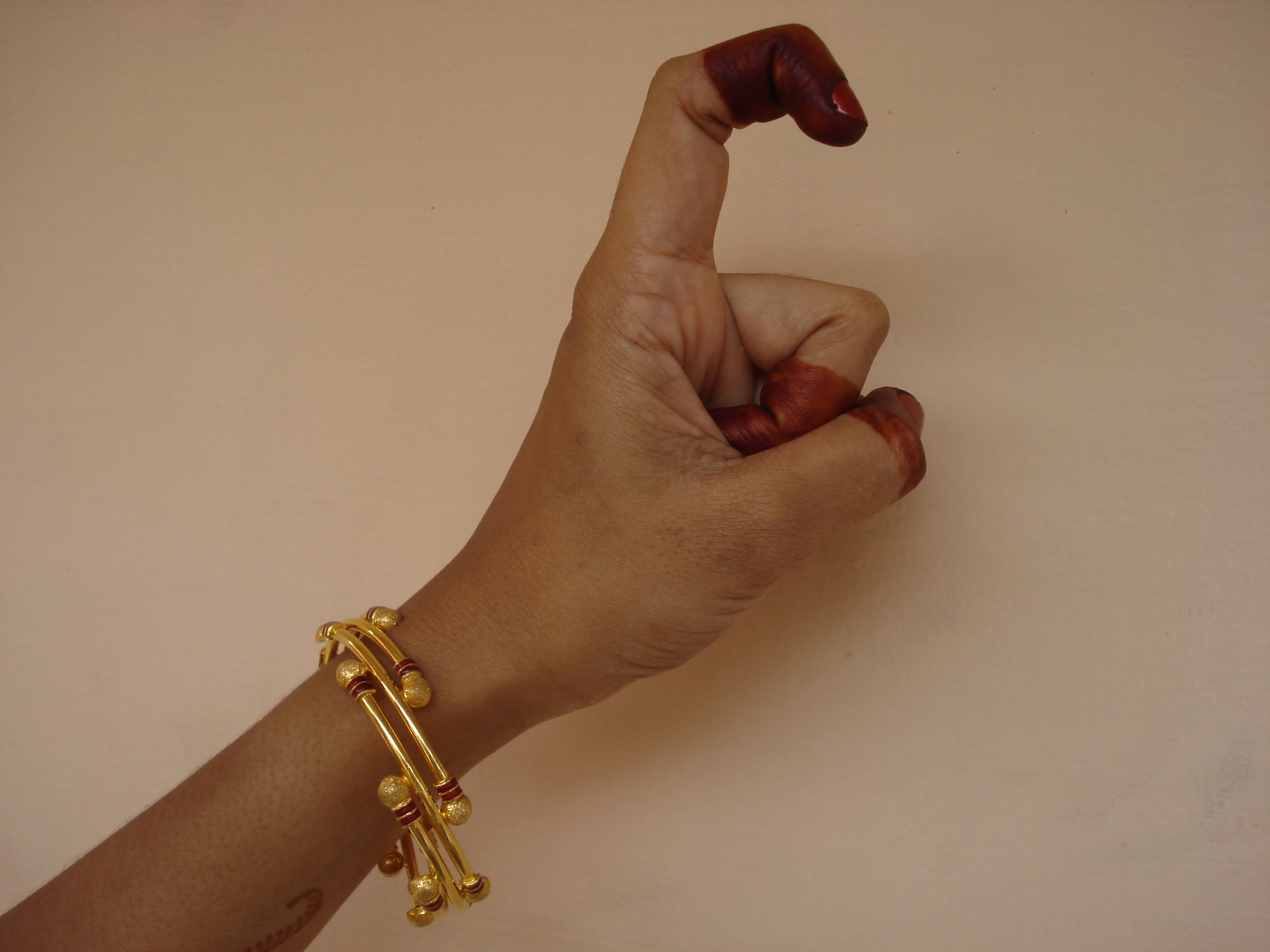
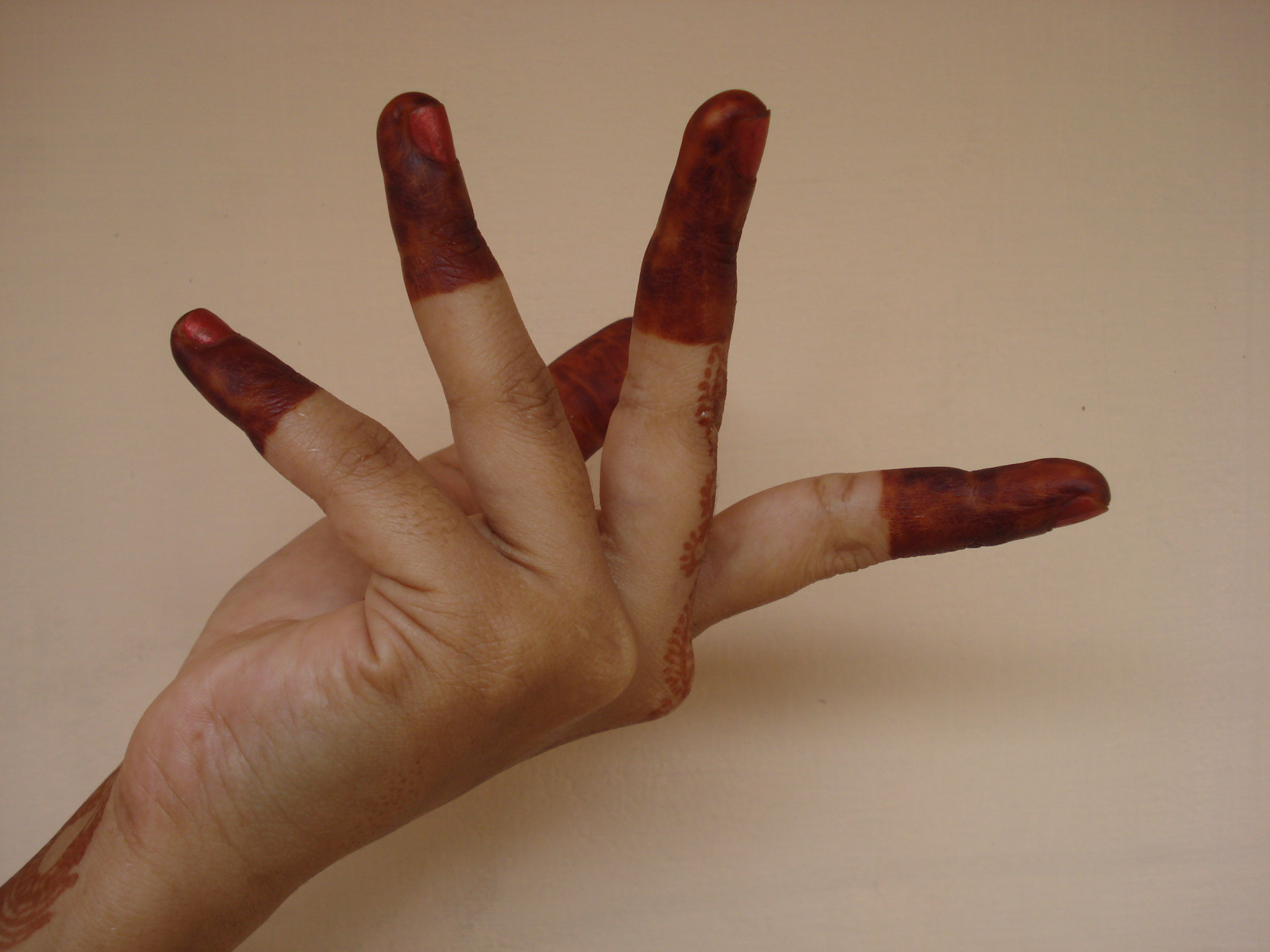
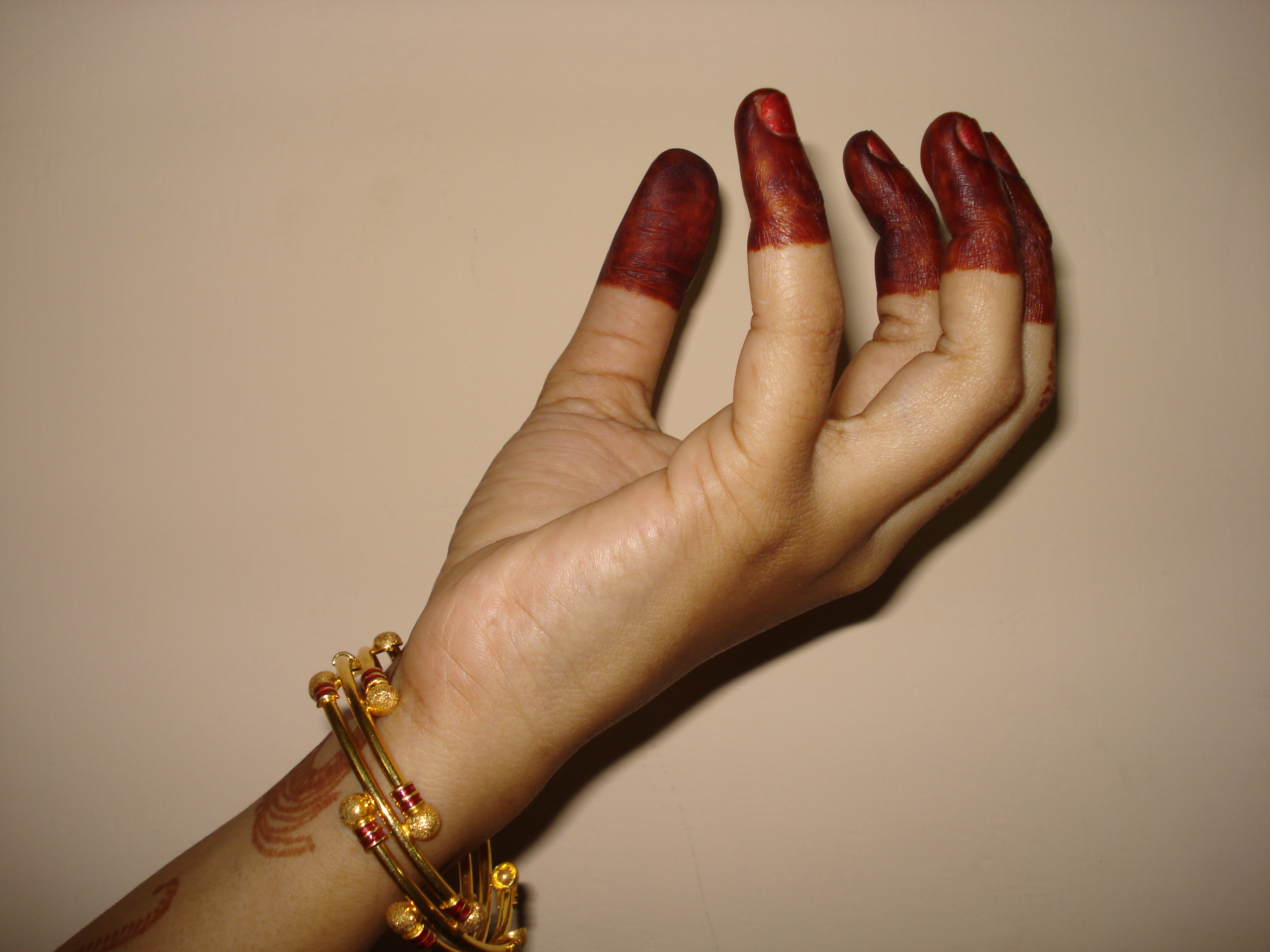
Example mudras – gestures as symbols in Bharatanatyam.

Video tutorial on hasta mudras

Communication through symbols takes the form of expressive gestures and pantomime set to music. The gestures and facial expressions convey the rasa (sentiment, emotional taste) and bhava (mood) of the underlying story. In the Hindu texts on dance, the dancer successfully expresses the spiritual ideas by paying attention to four aspects of a performance: Angika (gestures and body language), Vachika (song, recitation, music and rhythm), Aharya (stage setting, costume, makeup, jewelry), and Sattvika (the artist's mental disposition and emotional connection with the story and audience, wherein the artist's inner and outer states resonate). Abhinaya draws out the bhava (mood and psychological states).

The gestures used in Bharatanatyam are called hasta (or mudras). These symbols are of three types: asamyuta hastas (single hand gestures), samyuta hastas (two hand gestures), and nrtta hastas (dance hand gestures). Like words in a glossary, these gestures are presented in the nritta as a list or embellishment for a preliminary performance. In the nritya stage of Bharatanatyam, these symbols, set in a certain sequence, become sentences with meaning, with emotions expressed through facial expressions and other aspects of abhinaya. The basic standing position is called aramandi.

Bharatanatyam contains at least 20 asanass found in modern yoga, including Dhanurasana (the bow, a back-arch); Chakrasana (the wheel, a standing back-arch); Vrikshasana (the tree, a standing pose); and Natarajasana, the pose of dancing Shiva. A total of 108 karanas of classical temple dance are represented in temple statuary; they depict the devadasi temple dancers who made use of yoga asanas in their dancing. Bharatanatyam is also considered a form of Bhakti Yoga. However, Natarajasana is not found in any medieval hatha yoga text; it was among the many asanas introduced into modern yoga by Krishnamacharya in the early 20th century.

== Image Gallery ==
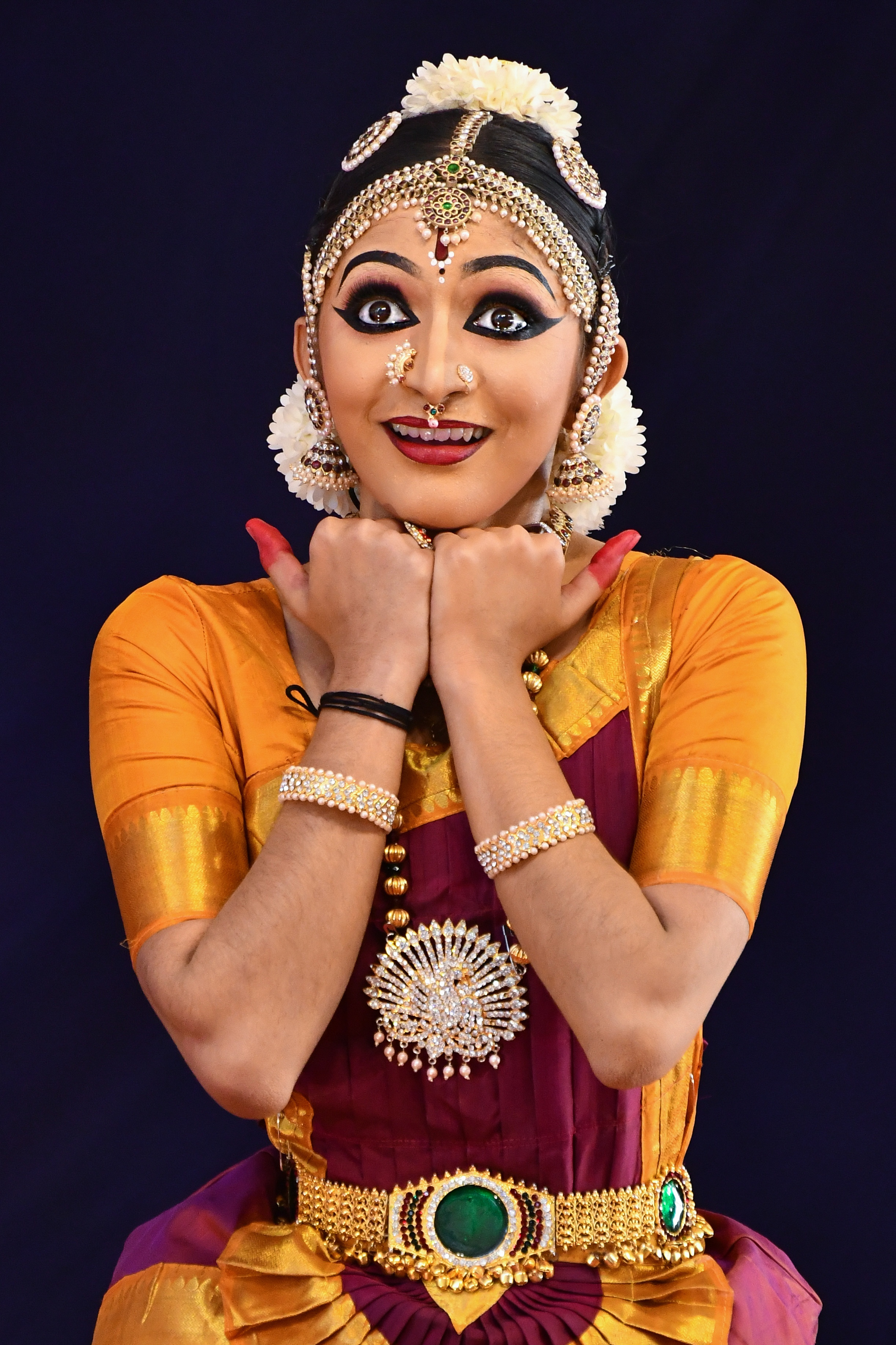
Artist: Anandalakshmi

== In cinema ==
One movement in the Bharatanatyam by Rama Vaidyanathan at the Guimet Museum (2009).

1. Senthamarai (Tamil, 1962)
2. Thillana Mohanambal (Tamil, 1968)
3. Phantom India - episode 2 (French, 1969)
4. Paattum Bharathamum (Tamil, 1975)
5. Sagara Sangamam (Telugu, 1983)
6. Mayuri (Telugu, 1985)
7. Manichitrathazhu (Malayalam, 1993)
8. Sringaram (Tamil, 2007)
9. Kamaladalam (Malayalam, 1992)
10. Kochu Kochu Santhoshangal (Malayalam)

== See also ==
- Culture of India
- Vazhuvoor (dance)

== Bibliography ==
- Uttara Asha Coorlawala, ed. Re-presenting Indian Dance. Dance Research Journal. Congress on Research in Dance 36/2. Winter 2004. ISSN 0149-7677
- Wallace Dace (1963). "The Concept of "Rasa" in Sanskrit Dramatic Theory". Educational Theatre Journal. 15 (3): 249–254. doi:10.2307/3204783. JSTOR 3204783.
- Danielou, Alain (1965). Shilappadikaram (The Ankle Bracelet) by Iḷaṅkōvaṭikaḷ. New Directions Publishing, New York. ISBN 978-0-8112-0001-1.
- Ragini Devi (1990). Dance Dialects of India. Motilal Banarsidass. ISBN 978-81-208-0674-0.
- Dikshitar, V R Ramachandra (1939), The Silappadikaram, Oxford University Press
- Fergusson, James (1880). The Caves Temples of India. W. H. Allen.
- Douglas M. Knight, Jr. Balasaraswati: Her Art and Life. Wesleyan University Press. Middletown, CT, 2010. ISBN 978-0-8195-6906-6
- Sunil Kothari, Bharata Natyam, Marg Publications, Mumbai: 1997.
- Natalia Lidova (2014). Natyashastra. Oxford University Press. doi:10.1093/obo/9780195399318-0071.
- Natalia Lidova (1994). Drama and Ritual of Early Hinduism. Motilal Banarsidass. ISBN 978-81-208-1234-5.
- Tarla Mehta (1995). Sanskrit Play Production in Ancient India. Motilal Banarsidass. ISBN 978-81-208-1057-0.
- Michell, George l (15 October 2014). Temple Architecture and Art of the Early Chalukyas: Badami, Mahakuta, Aihole, Pattadakal. Niyogi Books. ISBN 978-93-83098-33-0.
- Narayanan Chittoor Namboodiripad, "Revealing the Art of Natyasastra." ISBN 9788121512183
- Srividya Natarajan Another Stage in the Life of the Nation: Sadir, Bharatanatyam, Feminist Theory. Unpublished Ph.D. Thesis, Dept of English, University of Hyderabad, 1997.
- Emmie Te Nijenhuis (1974). Indian Music: History and Structure. BRILL Academic. ISBN 90-04-03978-3.
- Sukanya Rahman. Dancing in the Family. Rupa and Co. New Delhi: 2004. ISBN 81-291-0594-2
- Vijaya Rao, (1987), Abbild des Göttlichen. Bharata Natyam. Der klassische Indische Tanz. Freiburg (Germany)
- Richmond, Farley P.; Swann, Darius L.; Zarrilli, Phillip B. (1993). Indian Theatre: Traditions of Performance. Motilal Banarsidass. ISBN 978-81-208-0981-9.
- Kapila Vatsyayan (2001). Bharata, the Nāṭyaśāstra. Sahitya Akademi. ISBN 978-81-260-1220-6.
- Kapila Vatsyayan (1977). Classical Indian dance in literature and the arts. Sangeet Natak Akademi. OCLC 233639306., Table of Contents
- Kapila Vatsyayan (1974), Indian classical dance, Sangeet Natak Akademi, OCLC 2238067
- Kapila Vatsyayan (2008). Aesthetic theories and forms in Indian tradition. Munshiram Manoharlal. ISBN 978-8187586357. OCLC 286469807.
- Kapila Vatsyayan. Dance In Indian Painting. Abhinav Publications. ISBN 978-81-7017-153-9.
- Williams, Drid (2004). "In the Shadow of Hollywood Orientalism: Authentic East Indian Dancing" (PDF). Visual Anthropology. 17 (1). Routledge: 69–98. doi:10.1080/08949460490274013. S2CID 29065670. Archived from the original (PDF) on 4 March 2016.
