= Nieuwenhuis =

Nieuwenhuis or Nieuwenhuys is a Dutch surname cognate to English Newhouse and German Neuhaus. A great number of variant forms exist. "Nieuwen" can be replaced by Nei, Neij, Nein, Nie, Nien (e.g. Nienhuis), Nieuw, Nieuwe, Niewen, Nij (e.g. Nijhuis), Nijen (e.g. Nijenhuis), Nou and Nuwen. "Huis" can be Hues, Huijs, and Huys. Declensions may end with -se, -sen, -ze, and -zen (e.g. Nieuwenhuizen) and the name can start with van ("from"). Notable people with this name include:

- Anton Willem Nieuwenhuis (1864–1953), Dutch explorer who crossed Borneo in 1896–97
  - Named after him: Nieuwenhuis' Bulbul (a bird), Bulbophyllum nieuwenhuisii (an orchid), and others
- Berry Nieuwenhuys (1911–1984), South African football forward
- Christiaan Benjamin Nieuwenhuis (1863–1922), Dutch photographer in the Dutch East Indies
- Constant Nieuwenhuys (1920–2005), Dutch painter, sculptor, graphic artist, author and musician
- Jacob Nieuwenhuis (1777–1857), Dutch theologian and logician, founder of the Domela Nieuwenhuis family
- Jacques Nieuwenhuis (born 1980), Namibian rugby player
- Jan Nieuwenhuys (1922–1986), Dutch abstract painter
- Joris Nieuwenhuis (born 1996), Dutch racing cyclist
- Kirk Nieuwenhuis (born 1987), American baseball player
- Minnie Brinkhof-Nieuwenhuis (born 1952), Dutch racing cyclist, wife of Peter
- Peder Nieuwenhuis (1842–1924), Dutch-born Danish general and military historian
- Peter Nieuwenhuis (born 1951), Dutch racing cyclist, husband of Minnie
- Pim Nieuwenhuis (born 1976), Dutch competitive sailor
- Rob Nieuwenhuys (1908–1999), Dutch novelist
- Rudolf Nieuwenhuys (born 1927), Dutch neuroanatomist
- Theo Nieuwenhuis (1866–1951), Dutch Art Nouveau painter and designer

Domela Nieuwenhuis

- César Domela Nieuwenhuis (1900–1992), Dutch sculptor, painter, photographer, and typographer, son of Ferdinand
- Ferdinand Domela Nieuwenhuis (1846–1919), Dutch Lutheran pastor and the Netherlands' first prominent socialist
- Ferdinand Jacob Domela Nieuwenhuis (1808–1869), Dutch Lutheran theologian, father of Ferdinand
- Jan Derk Domela Nieuwenhuis Nyegaard (1870–1955), Dutch Lutheran minister and flamingant

== See also ==
- 7541 Nieuwenhuis, main-belt asteroid named after Henk Nieuwenhuis (b. 1938), Dutch planetarium curator
