= Niehues =

Niehues is a German toponymic surname, i.e. it has its source in the type of residence the family lived in.

== Etymology and pronunciation ==
The name Niehues etymologically comes from West Low German (here: Westphalian) dialects, being a compound word meaning "new house" (the High German variant of the name is Neuhaus).

The pronunciation of the name (German pronunciation: [ˈniːhuːs]) does not entirely follow High German pronunciation rules. The second vowel sound is written like the alternative High German spelling of an umlaut-ü sound (German pronunciation: [yː]), but it is pronounced like a normal u sound (German pronunciation: [uː], as in English pool).

Due to the non-standard German origin of the name, it is often misspelled or mispronounced even by Germans, if they are unfamiliar with the dialect.

== Origin and distribution ==
In today's Germany, the name Niehues can be found mostly in the regions where the Westphalian dialect is or was spoken, predominantly in the adjacent cities and districts Münster, Coesfeld, Steinfurt, Recklinghausen, Borken and Unna in the northwest of Germany close to the border of the Netherlands.

Outside of Germany, families named Niehues settled especially in the United States (here predominantly in Kansas, also in Texas, California, Louisiana and Ohio) and in Brazil.

== Geographical distribution ==
As of 2014, 60.8% of all known bearers of the surname Niehues were residents of Germany (frequency 1:19,098), 31.7% of Brazil (1:93,342) and 5.8% of the United States (1:903,128).

In Germany, the frequency of the surname was higher than national average (1:19,098) in the following states:

1. North Rhine-Westphalia (1:5,104)
2. Bremen (1:15,687)

In Brazil, the frequency of the surname was higher than national average (1:93,342) in the following states:

1. Santa Catarina (1:4,429)
2. Paraná (1:24,508)
3. Alagoas (1:65,622)

== People ==
- James Niehues (born c. 1946), American landscape artist and photographer
- Julian Niehues (born 2001), German footballer
- Leandro Niehues (born 1973), Brazilian soccer coach
- Maximilian Schulze Niehues (born 1988), German soccer player
- Miara Niehues (born 2004), Brazilian soccer player

== Places ==
In Germany, some place names are derived from farms bearing the (sometimes former) owner's name, for example Niehues near Nottuln. Also streets have been named after people named Niehues in Germany (e.g. Propst-Niehues-Straße in Marl, Niehuesstraße in Everswinkel), the Netherlands (e.g. Abraham Niehuesstraat in Hoogeveen) and Brazil (e.g. Rua João Teodoro Niehues in Braço do Norte), and Rua Antonio Niehues in {[Capanema - PR]}.

== See also ==
- Neuhaus (surname)
- Niehaus
- Nijhuis, a Dutch counterpart of the name
