= List of mudras (dance) =

Hand gestures in Indian classical dance

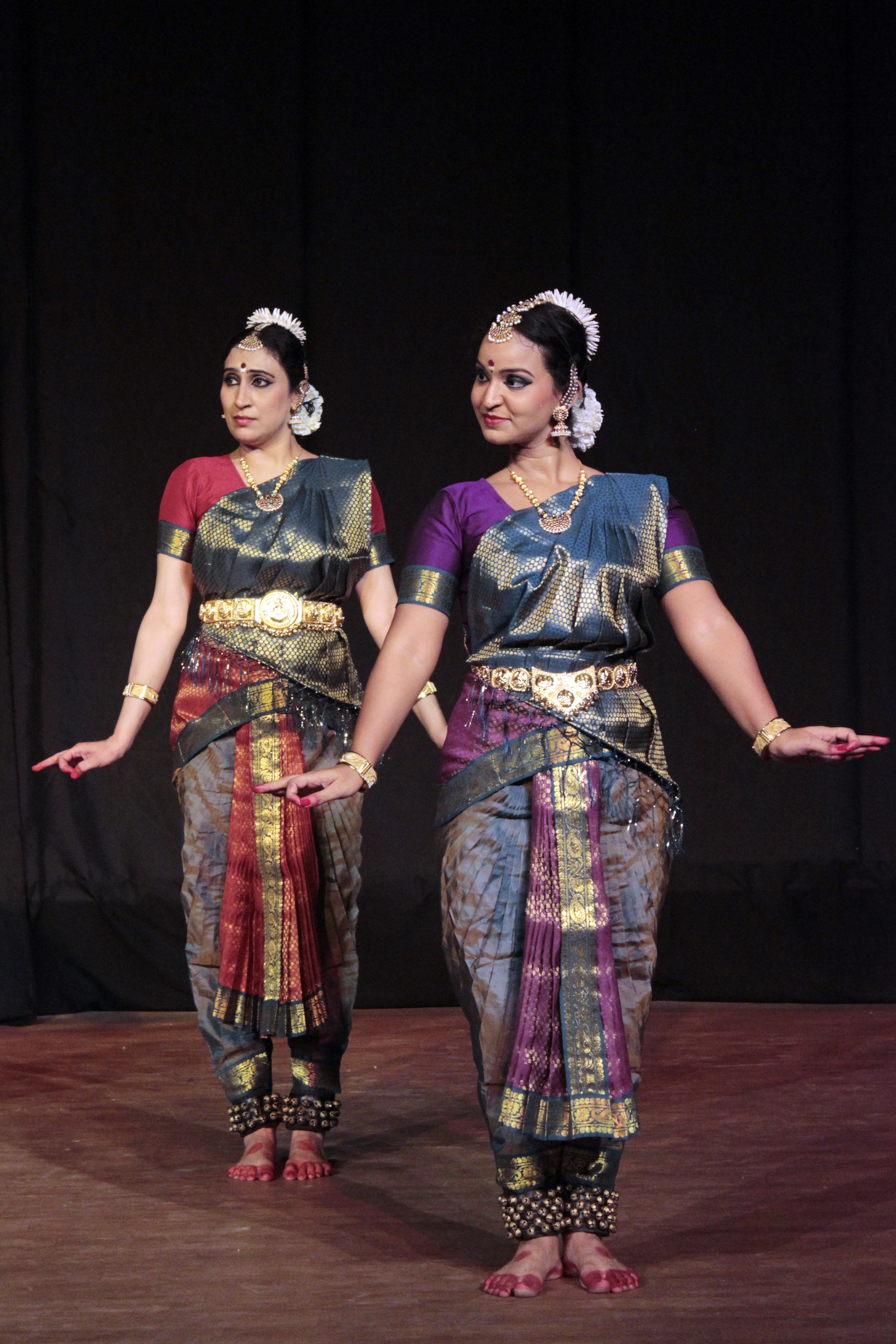
Bharatanatyam Mudra

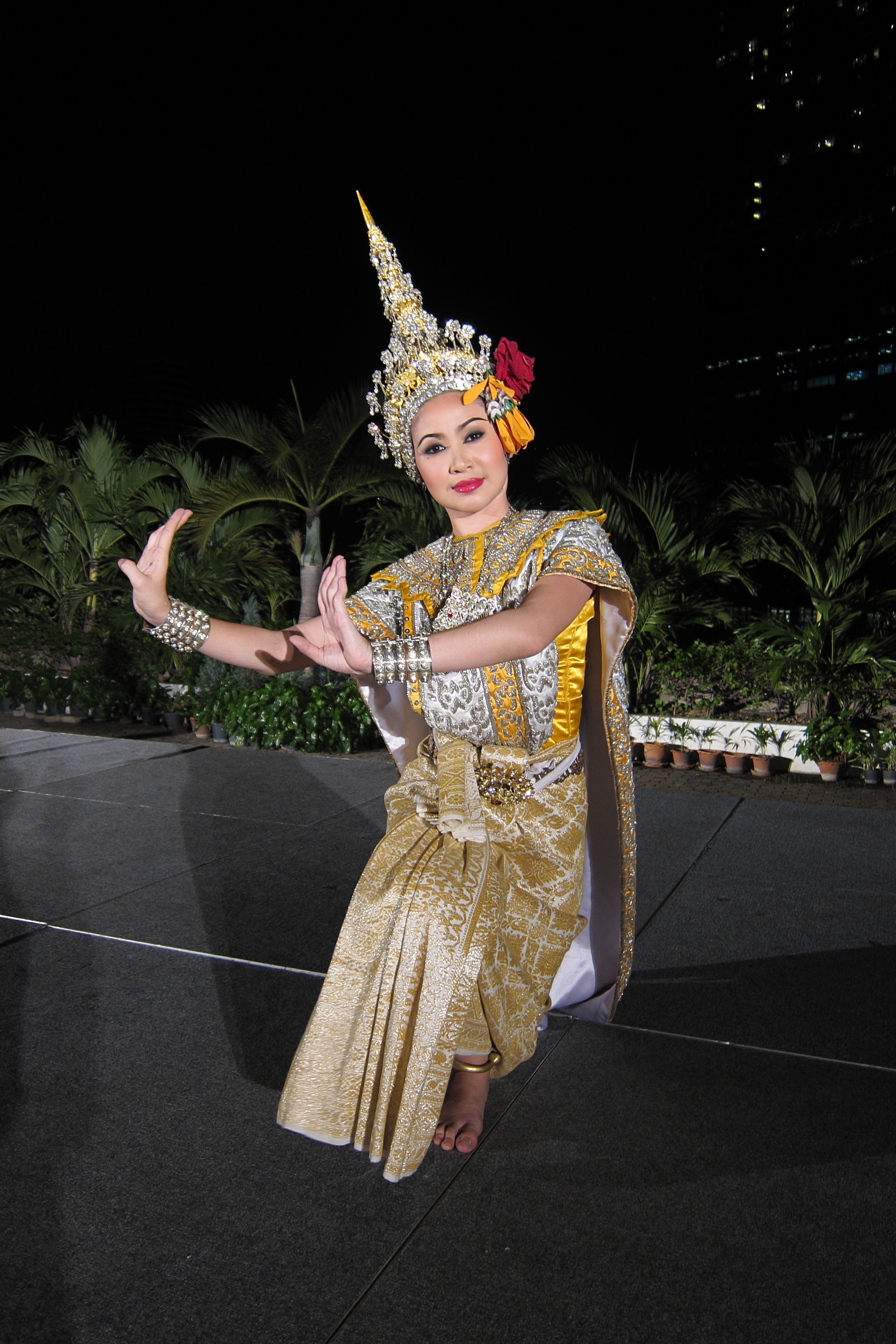
Thai Mudra

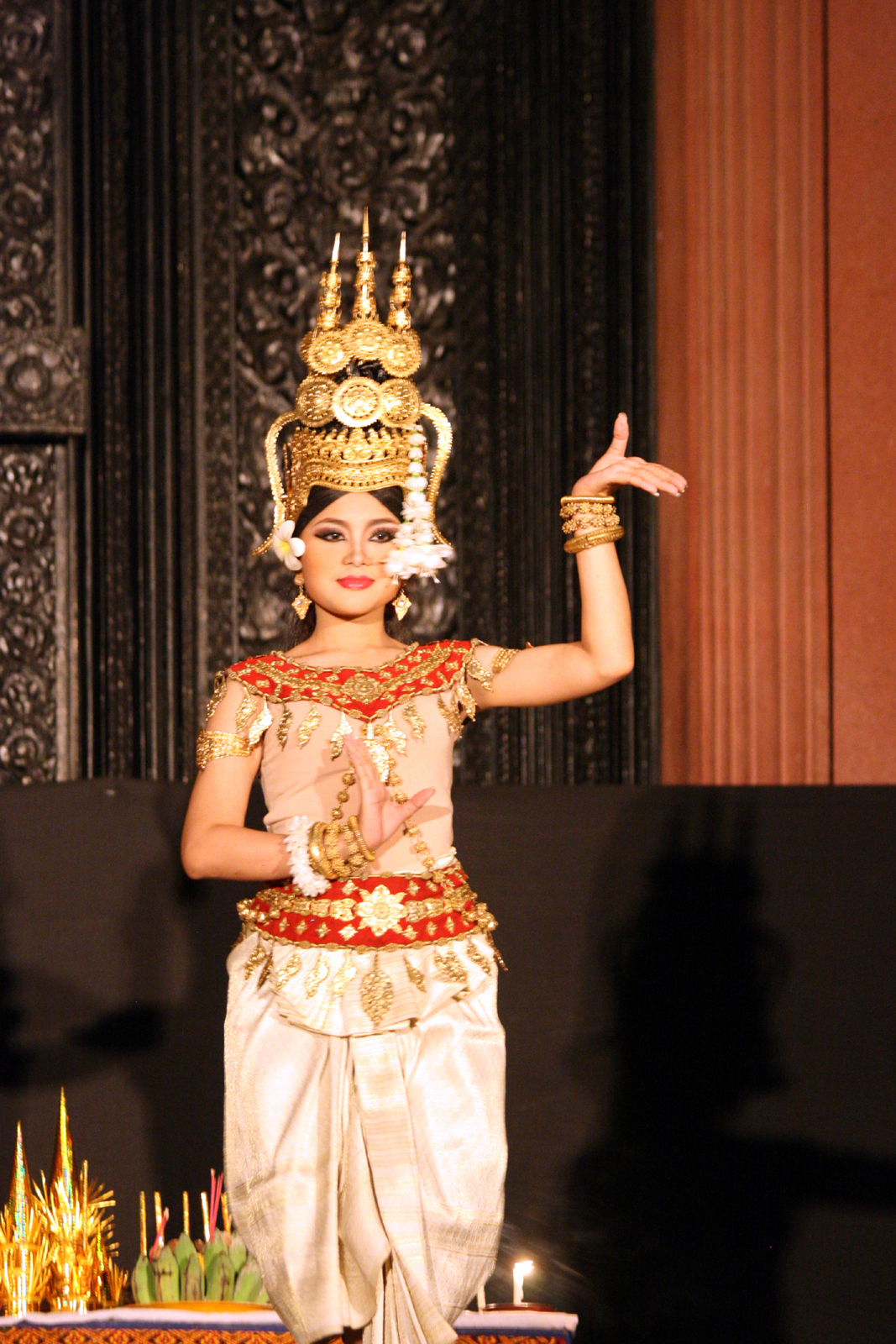
Khmer Mudra

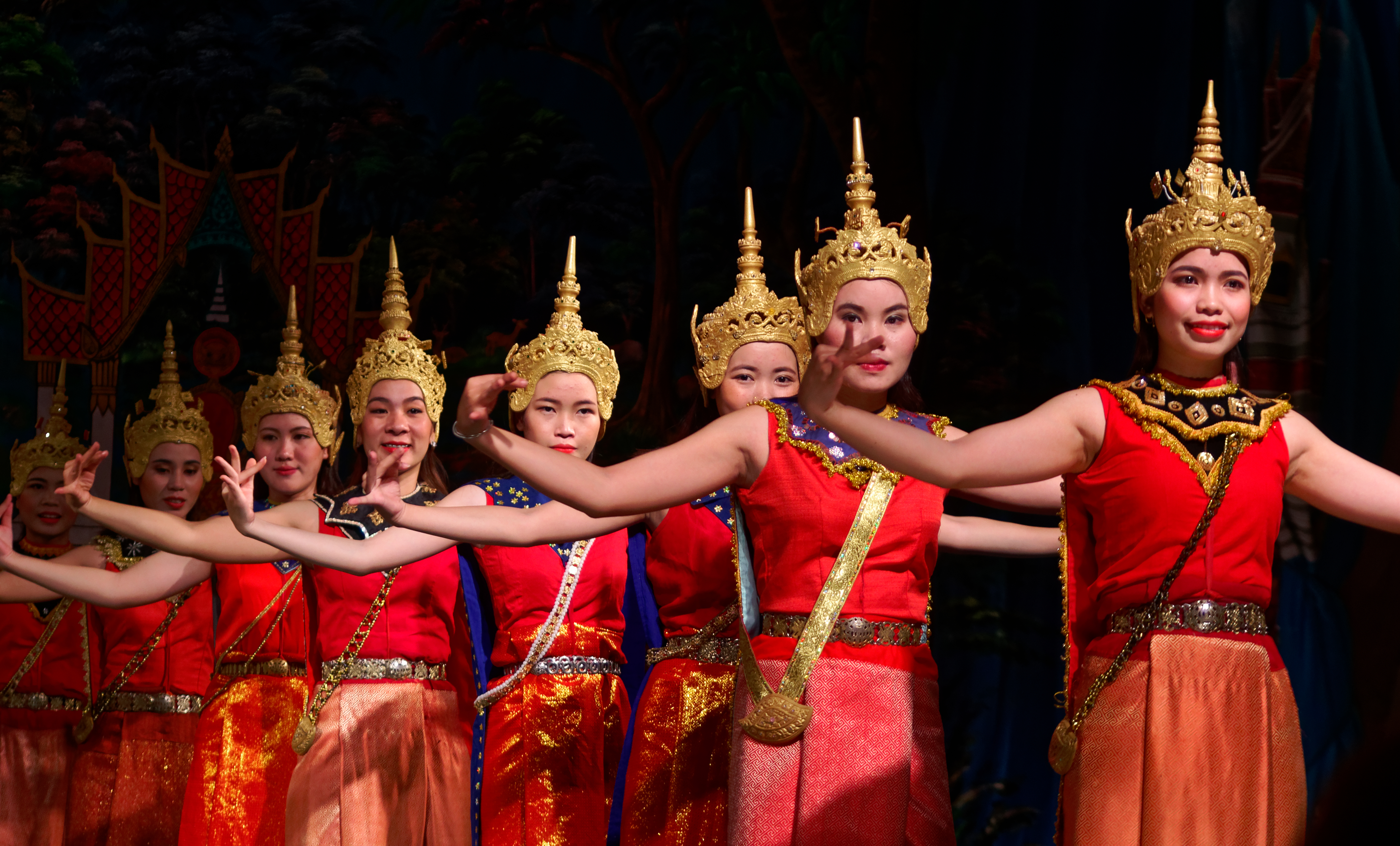
Lao Mudra

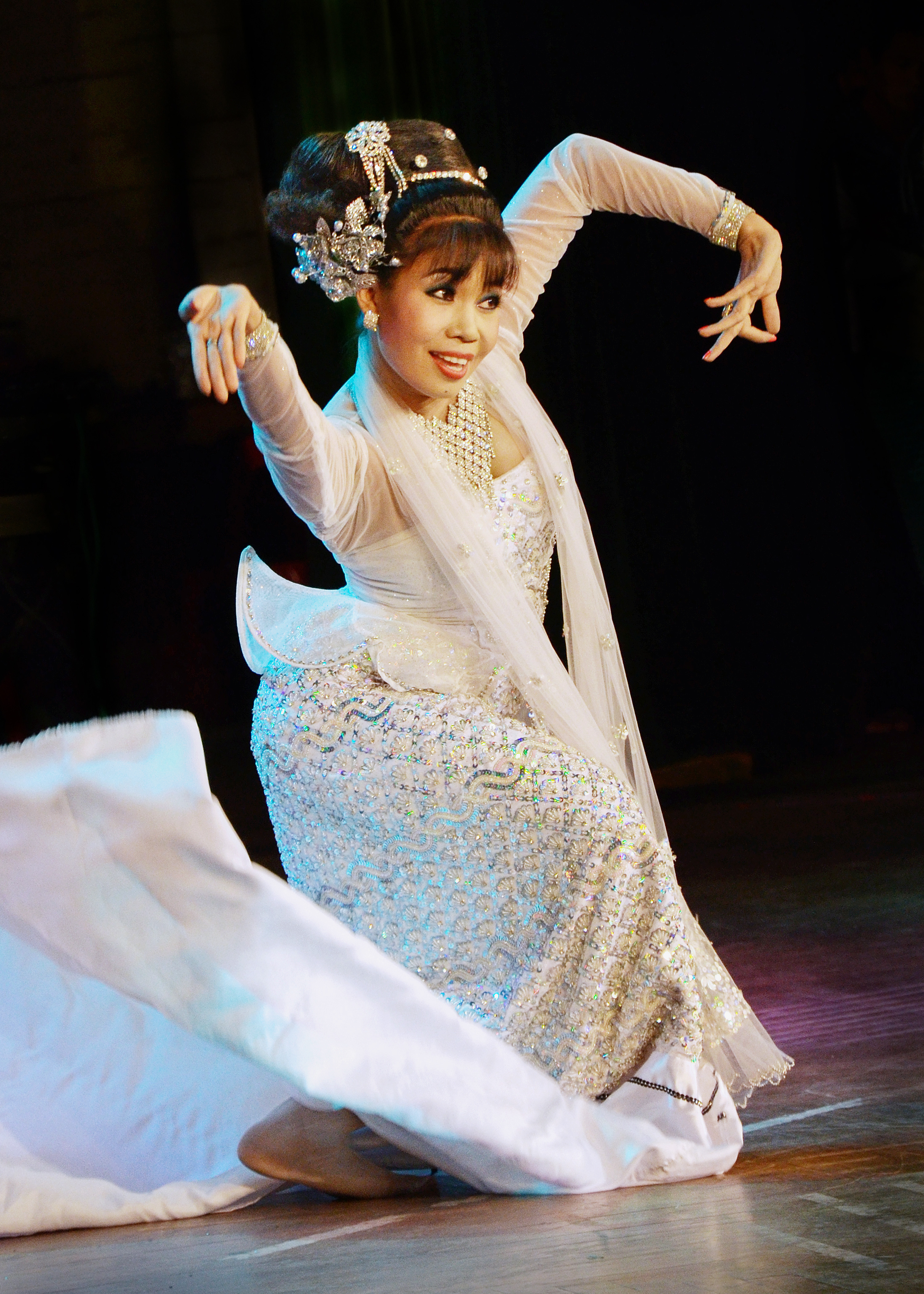
Burmese Mudra

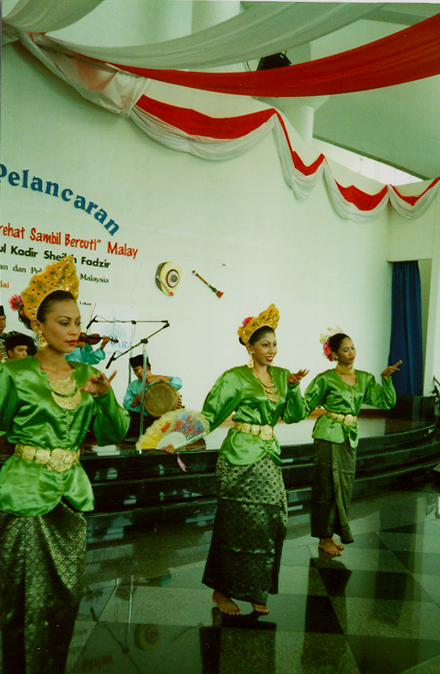
Malay Mudra

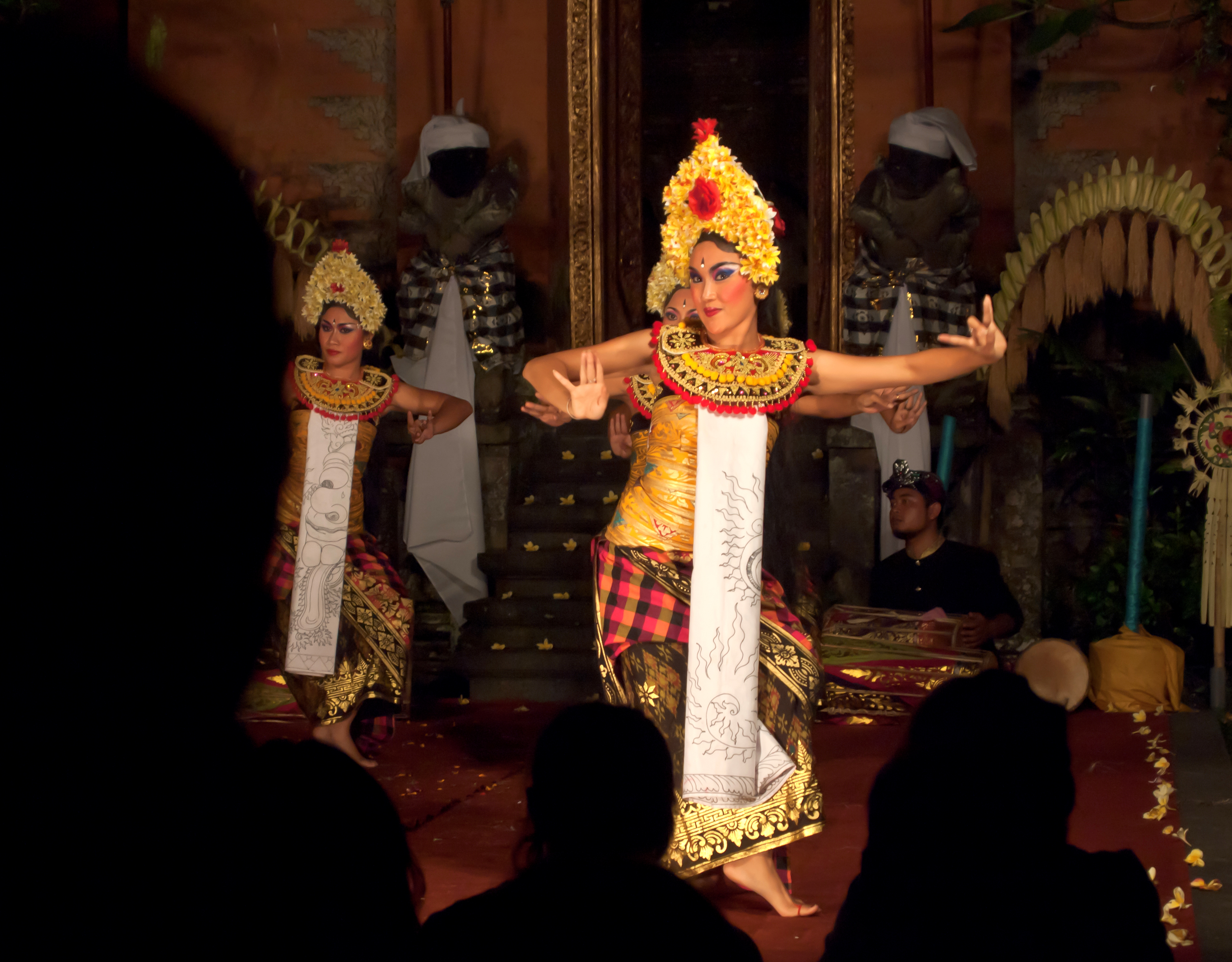
Balinese Mudra

One of the most striking features of Indian classical dance and dances of Thailand, Cambodia, Laos, Myanmar and the Malay world is the use of hand or finger gestures called mudras. Two classifications of mudras are used in Indian classical dance, Thai dances, Cambodian dances, Lao dances, Burmese dances and Malay dances, and are a prominent part of the dancer's vocabulary.

== Gestures ==
=== Bharatanatyam ===
In Bharatanatyam, a classical Indian dance, there are dozens of root mudras (hand or finger gestures).

Asamyuta hastas
#	Name in Sanskrit	Translation(s) in English	Other meanings and usage	Illustration
1.	Pataka	flag	beginning a dance, forest, river, sprinkling water, cloud, night, forbidding things, horse	
2.	Tripataka	three parts of the flag	tree, arrow, vajra weapon, Indra, crown, light rising, union	
3.	Ardhapataka	half flag	flag, temple tower, horn, riverbank, tender shoots, writing panel, knife	
4.	Kartarimukha	scissors face or arrow shaft face	separation of women and men, opposition, stealing, corner of the eye, death, disagreement, lightning	
5.	Mayura	peacock or peacock's beak	bird of omen, forehead, stroking the hair, wiping tears, argument	
6.	Ardhachandra	half moon	spear, platter, anxiety, meditation, prayer, greeting	
7.	Arala	bent	drinking poison	
8.	Shukatunda	parrot head	shooting an arrow, throwing a spear, mystery	
9.	Mushthi	closed fist	steadiness, holding things, grasping the hair, wrestling	
10.	Shikhara	mountain top or spire	God of Love, bow, pillar, sound of a bell, silence, questioning, husband, lover, embrace	
11.	Kapitta	wood apple	Goddess Lakshmi, Saraswati, holding cymbals, holding flowers at the time of flirting, milking cows	
12.	Katakamukha	opening of a bracelet	picking flowers, holding a pearl necklace or garland of flowers, drawing a bow slowly, speech, glancing	
13.	Suchi	needle	Parabrahma, one, one hundred, sun, city, world, fan, threatening, astonishment, umbrella, beating the drum	
14.	Chandrakala	crescent moon	digit of the moon	
15.	Padmakosha	lotus bud	water lily, fruit, apple, mango, breast	
16.	Sarpashirsha	snake head	giving water to Gods and sages, the flapping of elephant's ears, slowness	
17.	Mrigashirsha	deer head	women, calling the beloved, cheek, holding an umbrella, actor's costume, house, fear, discussion	
18.	Simhamukha	lion face	elephant, lotus, coral, pearl, garland, fragrance, drop of water, salvation when placed on the heart	
19.	Kangulashya	tail	Lakuce fruit, water lily, breast	
20.	Alapadma or Solapadma	lotus in full bloom	yearning for the beloved, mirror, moon pavilion, full moon, village, murmuring sound, praise	
21.	Chatura	square	eyes, musk, a little, breaking to pieces	
22.	Bhramara	bee	parrot, crane, cuckoo, union	
23.	Hamsasya	swan beak	tying the marriage thread, initiation, painting, drop of water	
24.	Hamsapaksha	swan wing	arranging, constructing a bridge, making marks with the nails, number six	
25.	Sandamsha	Padmakosha mudra repeatedly opened and closed	generosity, worship, offering, number five	
26.	Mukula	flower bud	water lily, the God of love, eating	
27.	Tamrachuda	rooster	crane, camel, calf, writing or drawing	
28.	Trishula	trident	three together, wood apple leaf	

Samyukta mudra
#	Sanskrit	English	Other Meanings	Illustration
1.	Anjali	offering		
2.	Kapotam	dove		
3.	Karkatam	crab		
4.	Swastikam	auspicious sign		
5.	Dola-Hastam	drummer's hands		
6.	Pushpaputam	bag of flowers		
7.	Utsangam	embrace		
8.	Shivalingam	sign of Shiva		
9.	Kataka-vardhanam	chain		
10.	Kartari-swastikam			
11.	Shakatam	carriage		
12.	Shankha	conch shell		
13.	Chakram	rotating disc		
14.	Pasha	ropes		
15.	Kilaka	bond		
16.	Samputa	round shaped casket		
17.	Matsya	fish		
18.	Kurma	tortoise		
19.	Varaha	boar		
20.	Garuda	half-eagle, half-human mount of Vishnu	bird(s) flying	
21.	Nagabandham	snakes entwined		
22.	Khattva	cot		
23.	Bherunda	pair of birds		

=== Khmer dances ===
In Khmer dances, mudras are known as kayvikear dai (កាយវិការដៃ). All of the mudras symbolize plants.

Name in Khmer	Translation(s) in English	Other meanings	Illustration
Kar chenh ph (ការចេញផ្)	Flowering	Release	
Kar dam (ការដាំ)	Planting		
Kar doh (ការដុះ)	Growing		
Phle (ផ្លែ)	Fruit		
Phle chrouh (ផ្លែជ្រុះ)	Falling fruit		
Phle toum (ផ្លែទុំ)	Ripe fruit		
Sloek (ស្លឹក)	Leaves		
Sloek kh (ស្លឹកខ្)	Young leaves		

=== Thai dances ===
Name in Thai	Translation(s) in English	Other meanings	Illustration
Taw chan (ตัวฉัน)	I, Myself		
Taw thex (ตัวเธอ)	You		

== See also ==
- List of gestures
- List of Indian dances
- Adavu
