= Nijenhuis (surname) =

Nijenhuis is a Dutch toponymic surname. It is a form of Nieuwenhuis ("new house") found most commonly in the provinces of Gelderland and Overijssel.

== Geographical distribution ==
As of 2014, 90.9% of all known bearers of the surname Nijenhuis were residents of the Netherlands (frequency 1:3,093), 3.4% of Australia (1:116,539), 1.2% of Brazil (1:2,763,678), 1.1% of Germany (1:1,234,287) and 1.0% of Canada (1:623,695).

In the Netherlands, the frequency of the surname was higher than national average (1:3,093) in the following provinces:

1. Overijssel (1:793)
2. Gelderland (1:1,203)
3. Drenthe (1:2,270)
4. Friesland (1:2,623)
5. Flevoland (1:2,719)
6. Groningen (1:2,857)

== People ==
- Albert Nijenhuis (1926–2015), Dutch and American mathematician. Named after him:
  - The mathematical operators Frölicher–Nijenhuis bracket, Nijenhuis–Richardson bracket, and Schouten–Nijenhuis bracket
- Andreas Nijenhuis-Bescher (born 1972), Dutch historian
- Arnold Adolf Bentinck van Nijenhuis (1798–1868), Dutch diplomat, Minister of Foreign affairs in 1848
- Beorn Nijenhuis (born 1984), Canadian-born Dutch speed skater
- Emmie te Nijenhuis (born 1931), Dutch ethnomusicologist
- Jan te Nijenhuis (born 1964), Dutch psychologist and psychometrician
- Johan Nijenhuis (born 1968), Dutch film director and producer
- Wiebe Nijenhuis (1955–2016), Dutch weightlifter

== See also ==
- Nienhuis, Nijhuis, different forms of the same surname
