= Niehaus =

Niehaus is a German surname, meaning "new house" in a Low German dialect.

== Geographical distribution ==
As of 2014, 47.3% of all known bearers of the surname Niehaus were residents of Germany (frequency 1:12,215), 35.4% of the United States (1:73,560), 13.8% of South Africa (1:28,200) and 1.4% of Canada (1:187,745).

In Germany, the frequency of the surname was higher than national average (1:12,215) in the following states:

1. Lower Saxony (1:2,934)
2. North Rhine-Westphalia (1:5,749)
3. Bremen (1:7,573)

In South Africa, the frequency of the surname was higher than national average (1:28,200) in the following provinces:

1. Western Cape (1:10,395)
2. Mpumalanga (1:14,656)
3. Free State (1:16,818)
4. North West (1:18,761)

In the United States, the frequency of the surname was higher than national average (1:73,560) in the following states:

1. Iowa (1:12,670)
2. Ohio (1:14,770)
3. Indiana (1:15,492)
4. Missouri (1:21,073)
5. Kentucky (1:22,121)
6. Minnesota (1:37,498)
7. South Dakota (1:39,864)
8. Illinois (1:40,797)
9. Nebraska (1:41,580)
10. Wisconsin (1:66,496)
11. West Virginia (1:72,193)

== People ==
- Bernd H. Niehaus Quesada (born 1941), Costa Rican lawyer and diplomat
- Carl Niehaus (born 1959), South African politician and diplomat
- Charles Henry Niehaus (1855–1935), American sculptor
- Dave Niehaus (1935–2010), American sportscaster
- Dick Niehaus (1892–1957), American baseball player
- Ed Niehaus, American businessman and publicist
- Frank Niehaus (1902–1985), American football player (American football)
- Joseph T. Niehaus, Sr. (1906–1989), American farmer, businessman, beekeeper, and politician
- Jutta Niehaus (born 1964), German racing cyclist
- Lennie Niehaus (1929–2020), American saxophonist, arranger, and composer
- Rena Niehaus (born 1954), German actress
- Ruth Niehaus (1925–1994), German actress
- Steve Niehaus (born 1954), American football player (American football)
- Tom Niehaus (born 1957), American politician
- Valerie Niehaus (born 1974), German actress

== See also ==
- Neuhaus, High German variant of the name
- Niehues, Westphalian variant of the name
- Edward F. Niehaus House in Berkeley, California
