= Pushpanjali =

Hindu ritual

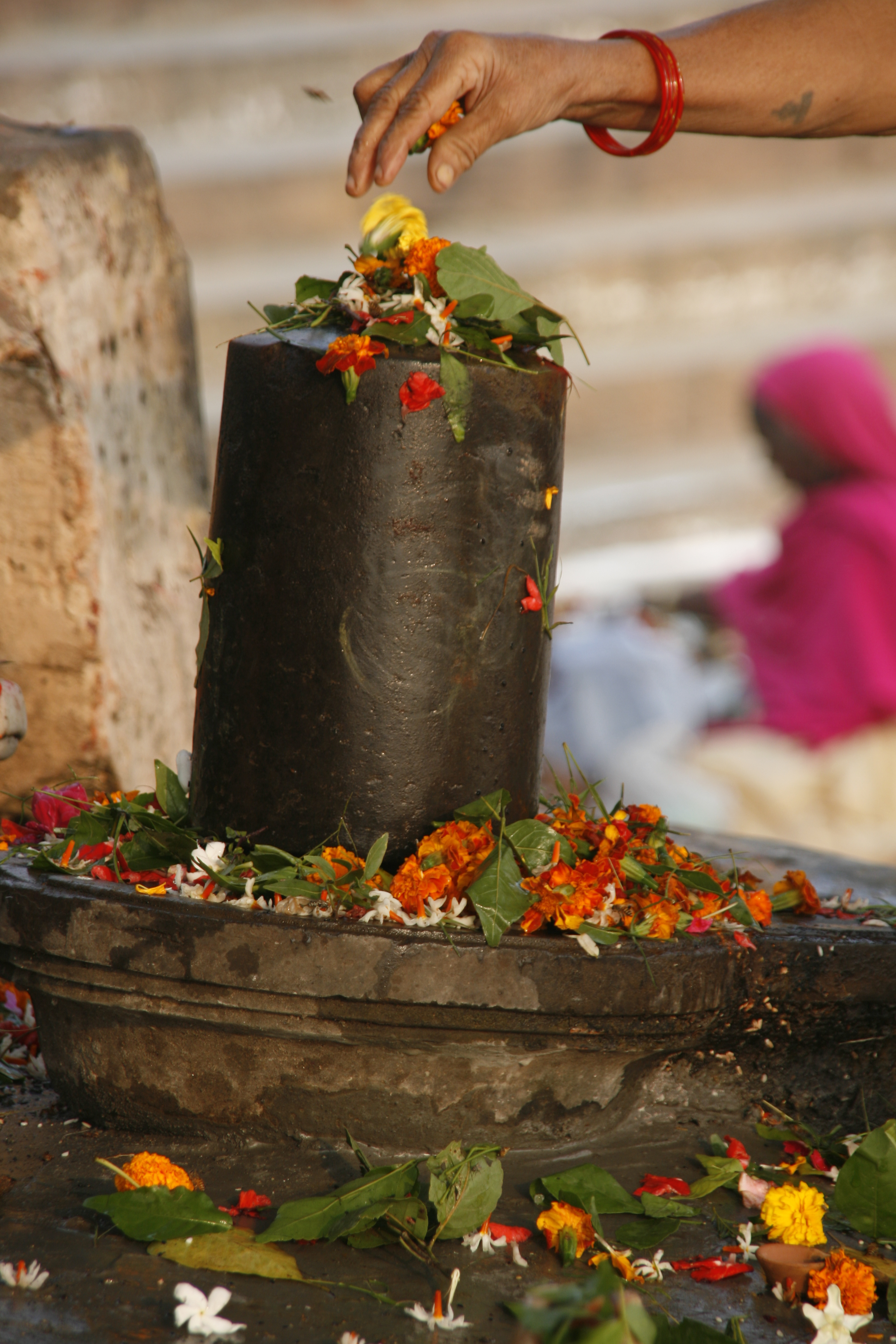
Pushpanjali to an Aikya Linga in Varanasi

Pushpanjali (Sanskrit:पुष्पाञ्जलि, literally folded hands full of flowers) is an offering of flowers to Hindu deities.

Pushpanjali is the offering of flowers to Hindu gods and goddesses. Pushpanjali is the combination of two words, pushpam and anjali. In Sanskrit, pushpam means flower and anjali means offering with folded hands.

== Bharatnatyam ==
Pushpanjali is also an invocatory dance conducted at the beginning of a Bharatnatyam performance. It is the salutation to Lord Nataraja, the Guru, the musicians, and the audience. In this rite, the dancer, either solo or in unison, cups fresh flowers in both hands and offers them in a continuous stream, invoking blessings and auspiciousness before the performance proper begins.

The dancer holds flowers to offer prayers to the Trinity of Gods, goddesses, ashta dikpalakas, and scholars in dance. By uniting ritual worship with classical technique, Pushpanjali frames the Margam sequence, establishing both spiritual intent and artistic focus at the outset of the recital.

== Etymology ==
The word Pushpanjali comes from Sanskrit: pushpa meaning "flower," and anjali meaning "an offering made by cupping the hands" or "salutation gesture." In this light, Pushpanjali literally translates to "flower-offering," encapsulating both the devotional act of presenting flowers and the ritual gesture of joined palms.

The earliest explicit reference to offering flowers in cupped hands appears in Bharata Muni’s Natyasastra, where the invocatory ceremony at the outset of dance and theatre performances is prescribed to invoke divine blessings and auspiciousness before the artistic display begins.
