= Neuhaus (surname) =

Neuhaus is a German surname meaning "new house".

== Geographical distribution ==
As of 2014, 68.0% of all known bearers of the surname Neuhaus were residents of Germany (frequency 1:4,092), 11.7% of the United States (1:106,942), 10.1% of Switzerland (1:2,808) and 5.8% of Brazil (1:122,170).

In Germany, the frequency of the surname was higher than national average (1:4,092) in the following states:

1. North Rhine-Westphalia (1:1,341)
2. Bremen (1:3,022)

In Switzerland, the frequency of the surname was higher than national average (1:2,808) in the following cantons:

1. Canton of Fribourg (1:315)
2. Canton of Bern (1:1,527)
3. Canton of Neuchâtel (1:2,258)
4. Canton of Solothurn (1:2,311)
5. Canton of Aargau (1:2,435)

== People ==
- Beatriz Neuhaus (born 1925), Argentine human rights activist
- Florian Neuhaus (born 1997), German footballer
- Gert Neuhaus (born 1939), German artist
- Heinrich Neuhaus (1888–1964), Soviet pianist
- Max Neuhaus (1939–2009), American percussionist
- Richard John Neuhaus (1936–2009), American-Canadian Catholic priest and writer
- Stanislav Neuhaus (1927–1980), Soviet pianist, son of Heinrich

== See also ==
- Niehaus, Low German variant of the name
- Niehues, Westphalian variant of the name
