= Alarippu =

Alarippu is traditionally the first dance piece that Bharatanatyam dancers learn. It is usually done first before other dances. The Alarippu can be in five different Jathis. The alarippu is a Tamil word, அலாரிப்பு. Allarippu means the blossoming of a dancer. This dance item is composed of basic steps. It contains no Abhinaya. Alarippu symbolizes the offering of respect to god, the guru, and the audience. The dance is entirely based on rhythm and focuses on relaxing the dancer's body. It contains a lot of neck, eye, and head movements.

The Alarippu (meaning flowering bud) is traditionally the first dance piece that Bharatanatyam dancers learn and perform in this type of classical dance recital. The Alarippu was created in five different talas by the four brothers, namely the Tanjore Quartet. It is a type of Nritta, which is a dance with no facial expressions

(verbal percussionist) and a mridangist. While dancing this piece shows basic steps. It contains no abhinaya (facial expressions). The act is entirely based on rhythm and is focused on relaxing the body of the dancer, thereby relaxing their mind and symbolizes their awakening.
