= Nienhuis =

Nienhuis is a Dutch toponymic surname. It is a form of Nieuwenhuis ("new house") found most commonly in the provinces of Groningen and Drenthe.

== Geographical distribution ==
In 2014, 57.6% of all known bearers of the surname were residents of the Netherlands (frequency 1:9,281), 33.4% of the United States (1:342,418) and 5.4% of Canada (1:213,942).

In the Netherlands, the frequency of the surname was higher than national average (1:9,281) in the following provinces:

- Groningen (1:1,206)
- Drenthe (1:2,015)
- Friesland (1:6,666)
- Flevoland (1:7,688)
- Overijssel (1:8,224)
- Utrecht (1:8,945)

== People ==
- Arthur W. Nienhuis (1941–2021), American physician
- Bert Nienhuis (1873–1960), Dutch ceramist
- Doug Nienhuis (born 1982), American football offensive lineman
- Han-Wen Nienhuys (born 1975), Dutch programmer, co-creator of Lilypond
- Hendrik Nienhuis (1790–1862), Dutch legal scholar
- Henk Nienhuis (1941–2017), Dutch football midfielder and manager
- Kraig Nienhuis (born 1961), Canadian professional ice hockey player
- Leonard Nienhuis (born 1990), Dutch football goalkeeper

Nienhuijs / Nienhuys

- Jacob Nienhuys (1836–1927), Dutch tobacco plantation owner and founder of Deli Company
- Jan Willem Nienhuys (born 1942), Dutch mathematician, book translator, and skeptic

== See also ==
- Nieuwenhuis, Nijenhuis, different forms of the same surname
