= Emmie te Nijenhuis =

Dutch ethnomusicologist

Emmie te Nijenhuis (born 11 November 1931) is a Dutch ethnomusicologist of the music of India. She was an associate professor of Indian musicology at Utrecht University between 1964 and 1988.

== Life ==
Te Nijenhuis was born in Bussum on 11 November 1931. She studied classical piano at the Utrechts Conservatorium from 1951 to 1955. From 1951 to 1964 she concurrently studied Western musicology, Sanskrit and Indian musicology at Utrecht University. From 1964 to 1988 she was an associate professor of Indian musicology at the same institute. She obtained her PhD at Utrecht University under Jan Gonda in 1970. After retiring in 1988 she founded a private music school in 1991. She contributed to the German-language music encyclopedia Die Musik in Geschichte und Gegenwart, writing the entry on Arnold Adriaan Bake.

Te Nijenhuis was elected a member of the Royal Netherlands Academy of Arts and Sciences in 1978.
