= R Muthukannammal =

Indian dancer

R Muthukannammal (born 1937) is a seventh-generation veteran Sadir dancer from the Indian State of Tamil Nadu. She is the only surviving person among the 32 Devadasis who served the deity at the Viralimalai Murugan temple and she is the last woman to have the ceremony pottukkattutal of dedicating oneself to God performed at the Viralimalai temple. In the year 2022, the government of India honoured Muthukannammal by conferring the Padma Shri award for her contributions in the field of art. The dance form Sadir, variously called as Sadiraattam or Parathaiyar Aattam or Thevarattam, is a classical Indian dance from which was reinvented, modified and rechristened as Bharatanatyam through the efforts of E Krishna Iyer in 1932. However, Muthukannammal has chosen to call her art form Sadir, making her the only Sadir exponent today.

== Early life and education ==
Muthukannammal was born in 1937 in Viralimalai, 28 km from Trichy into a hereditary Isai Vellalar family of dancers and musicians. She is the daughter of Ramachandra Nattuvanaar (1890-1988) who himself was a much respected dancer, a competent dance teacher and the most popular and respected nattuvanar in Viralimalai. Since her family is a dancers' family, she had started dancing from the time she learned to walk. At the age of seven, she had pottukkattutal performed at Viralimalai Murugan temple and she had her arangetram (début on-stage performance). Later she was trained extensively in dancing by her father and grandmother.

Her family was closely associated with temple dance practices at Viralimalai Murugan temple and other temples, and also with the Pudukkottai Palace. Her family was under the patronage of Pudukkottai kings. King Rajagopala Tondaiman, the ninth and last ruler of the princely state of Pudukkottai, had gifted agricultural lands to her family for their temple services. However, due to the strong ant-Devadasi movement then raging in Tamil Nadu, especially in Viralimalai, there was a steep decline in interest among the general public and temple administrators in the ritualistic traditional performances of dance and music by Muthukannammal and members of her family. This resulted in the dwindling of a regular income and Muthukannammal and her family had go through severe hardship and forcing her to adapt by performing at weddings and other social functions.

== Recognition: Padma Shri ==
- In the year 2022, Govt of India conferred the Padma Shri award, the third highest award in the Padma series of awards, on R Muthukannammal for her distinguished service in the field of art. The award is in recognition of her service as a "Veteran 7th generation Sadir dancer from Viralimalai, a custodian of the early tradition of Bharatanatyam."

== Other recognitions ==
- "DakshinaChitra Virudhu", an annual award instituted by The Madras Craft Foundation and The Friends of DakshinaChitra to honour folk performing artists (2018)
- G Chandrasekharan, former principal of Government College of Fine Arts, Chennai, made a sculpture of Muthukannamal in clay at his art school for the disabled in Tirunelveli in 2017.
- In the year 2019, Films Division of India released the biopic entitled "Devaradiyar in Sadhir: The Life and Art of Muthukannammal. Directed by S.Shanmuganathan"

== See also ==
- Padma Shri Award recipients in the year 2022

== Additional reading ==
- Chapter 4 titled "Historical Traces and Unfinished Subjectivity: Remembering Devadasi Dance at Viralimalai" in the book Unfinished Gestures: Devadasis, Memory, and Modernity in South India by Davesh Soneji published by The University of Chicago Press, Chicago, in 2012 (pages 161-188).
- Margot Cohen (13 August 2018). "Pride and prejudice: Sadir has stirred scholarly debate in India and abroad, can the dance form finally get its mojo back?". The Firstpost.
- R Ilangovan (27 December 2013). "Seeing beyond Sadir". Frontline.
- "From Sadir Attam to Bharatanatyam". Indian Culture. Govt of India.
