= Bangalore Nagarathnamma =

Indian Carnatic singer (1878–1952)

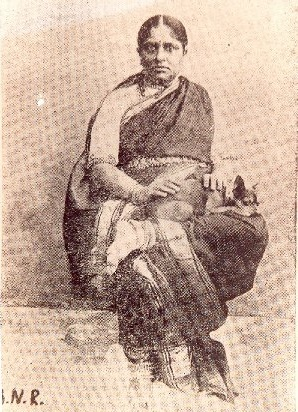
- Nagarathnamma with her pet dog c. 1929
- Born: 3 November 1878; Nanjangud, Kingdom of Mysore, British India
- Died: 19 May 1952 (aged 73); Thiruvaiyaru, Madras State, India
- Occupation: Carnatic singer

Bangalore Nagarathnamma (3 November 1878 – 19 May 1952) was an Indian Carnatic singer, cultural activist, scholar, and devadasi. A descendant of devadasis, she was also a patron of the arts and a historian. ban built a temple over the samadhi of the Carnatic singer Tyagaraja at Thiruvaiyaru and helped establish the Tyagaraja Aradhana festival in his memory. Within a male-dominated festival, she was the feminist strong enough to ensure that women artists were given equality to participate in it. She "was among the last practitioners of the devadasi tradition in India," and the first president of the Association of the Devadasis of Madras Presidency. She also edited and published books on poetry and anthologies.

== Early life ==
Nagarathnamma was born in 1878 to Puttu Lakshmi and Vakil Subba Rao, in Nanjangud. Puttu Lakshmi's ancestors served as singers and musicians in the court of Mysore. Abandoned by Subba Rao, she found refuge under Shastri, a Sanskrit scholar in the court of the Mysore Maharaja. He educated Nagarathnamma in Sanskrit and music, and she was initiated in devadasi at the age of five. However, Shastri also abandoned Nagarathnamma who soon left Mysore and found protection under her uncle, Venkitaswamy Appa, a violinist by profession. Nagarthnamma continued her studies and learned Kannada, English and Telugu, also becoming proficient in music and dance. She was trained in Carnatic music by Munuswamappa in the 'shishya-parampara' (tradition of the student teacher learning process), on the process set by Thyagaraja. She was able to make her first stage appearance before a learned audience as a violinist and dancer at the age of 15.

== Career ==
Mukunda Mala stotra by Bengaluru Nagaratnamma

Nagarathnamma became a singer early in her life and emerged as one of the best Carnatic singers of her time. She sang in Kannada, Sanskrit and Telugu. Her special musical forte included Harikatha. Her talent in dance attracted the attention of the Mysore ruler Jayachamarajendra Wodeyar who, impressed with her talent, made her the Asthana Vidushi (court dancer) in Mysore. Following the death of the ruler, she moved to Bangalore. She attained popularity in Bangalore not only in music but also in dance. She was also patronized by many other royal houses such as those of Travancore, Bobbili, and Vijayanagaram. Narahari Rao, a judge in the High Court of Mysore, was one of Nagarathnamma's patrons and he suggested to her to move to Madras (now Chennai) to further her career as a musician and dancer. She shifted to there as it was considered the "Heart of Carnatic music" and her musical talent was further developed. Here, she specifically identified herself as Bangalore Nagarathnamma.

The patronage she received from Justice Narahari Rao made her famous as a "concert artist" in Madras. As promoter of Tyagaraja Aradhana, she was the "first female artist to pay income tax" in Madras, India.

== Thyagaraja memorial and Aradhana ==
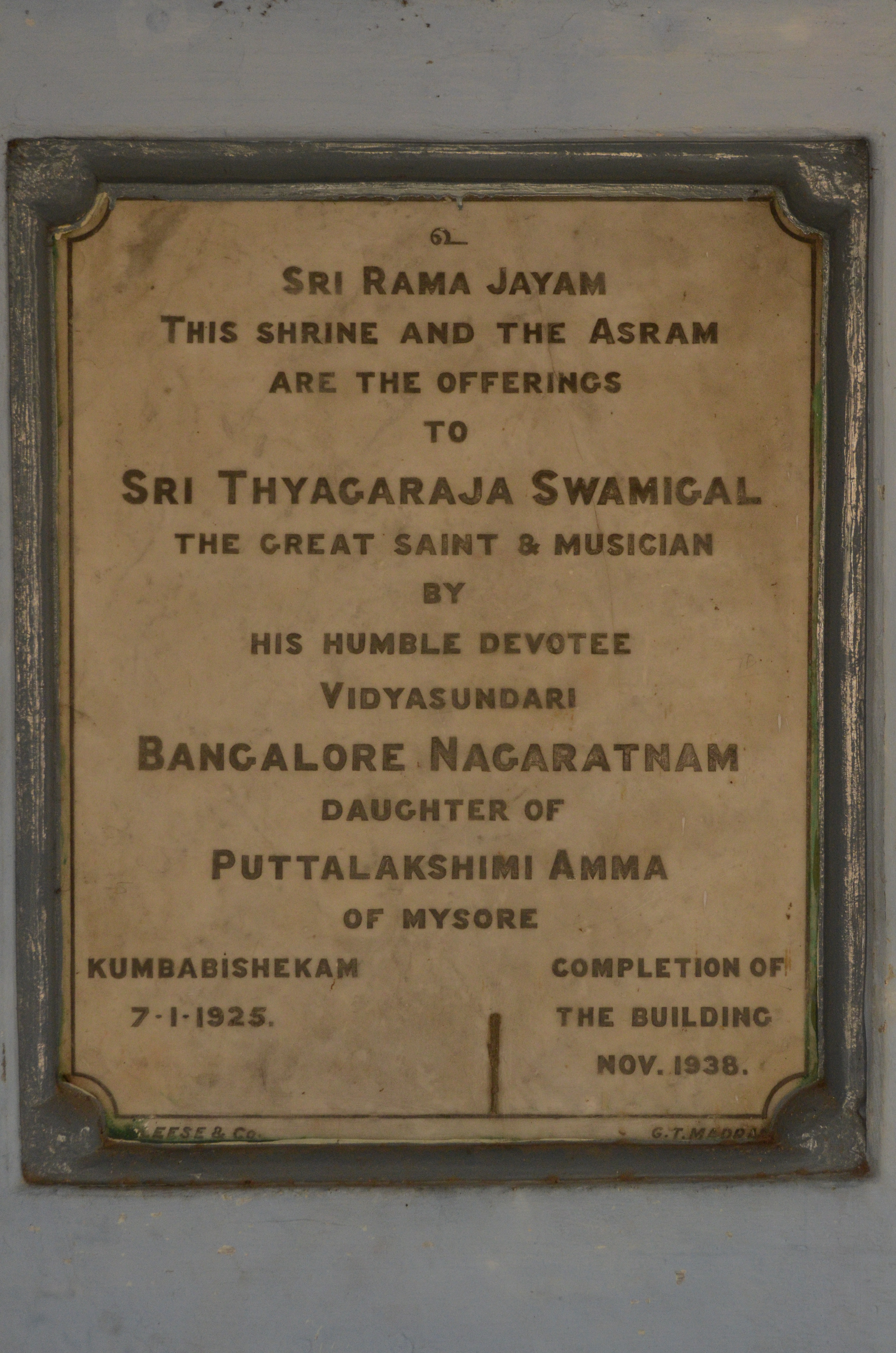
Marble notice board at ashram of singer Tyagaraja at Thiruvaiyaru

According to Nagarathnamma, she was directed in a dream to build a memorial in honour of Thyagaraja and create a platform for perpetuating Carnatic music. Following this, she turned to an ascetic way of life and donated all her earnings to this cause.

While in Madras, Nagarathnamma was informed by her guru, Bidaram Krishnappa, of the dilapidated status of the samadhi or tomb of saint Thyagaraja. Bidaram Krishnappa's disciples, Krishna Bhagavatar and Sundara Bhagavatar, had erected a small edifice made of marble in 1903 and held annual music festivals in honour of Thyagaraja thereafter. Within a few years, a feud had erupted among people interested in honouring the saint, and two rival groups were holding two rival concerts at the saint's samadhi. Upkeep of the tiny edifice had suffered and it had quickly fallen into dilapidation. This prompted Nagarathnamma to take steps to restore the samadhi and convert it into a memorial in honour of the Thyagaraja. She acquired the land where Thyagaraja's samadhi was located and built a larger edifice embodying a temple in his honour with her own financial resources. She arranged for an idol of sri Thyagaraja to be installed and consecrated by Brahmin priests and for prayers to be offered daily. The Thyagaraja Temple thus constructed was consecrated in 1921.

At that time, the music festival held at this location was male-dominated for the simple reason that in thosen days, decent woman would never sing or dance, and these skills were strictly the preserve of the courtesan and the devadasi, the two types of divine artists found in south India at that time. The idea of one or more female artist singing and participating in the annual functions of the shrine was anathema to society, and the rival performing groups therefore prevented Nagarathnamma from participating in the festival, even though she had paid for the renovation and she said that she would not sing or dance like a courtesan, but would only recite Harikatha in front of the deity. Nevertheless, she was refused. She took this as a challenge and started organizing a parallel music festival at the back of the saint's temple. Her group was named "Pengal Katchi" (women's group), and the Aradhana organized by her was held concurrently with the one organized by the male centric groups of the music festival, known as the "Periya Katchi" or "major group". Eventually, in 1941, her activism paid off, and the opposing groups involved with the festival merged into a single entity, allowing both men and women to sing in the festival.

This music festival has become one of the most popular musical events in South India. This tradition of women musicians' participation at the annual festival, known popularly as the "Thyagaraja Aradhana", along with male musicians, has continued over the years. In 1927, Nagarathnamma and other devadasis established the Association of the Devadasis of Madras Presidency; she was elected its first president.

== Literary pursuits ==
As an erudite and scholarly person, Nagarathnamma dabbled in editing and publishing books on poetry and anthologies. She was a linguist who held religious discourses not only in Kannada, her mother tongue, but also in other languages such as Sanskrit, Tamil and Telugu. During her foray into literature, she came across an old poem called the Radhika Santawanam (Appeasing Radhika), which she found inadequately covered vis-a-vis the original version written by Muddupalani, a courtesan herself, in Telugu verses. This was a book which Paidipati Venkatanarasu had edited based on the ready to print version, which Charles Phillip Brown, an eminent scholar in Telugu, had prepared and deposited in the Oriental Manuscripts Library in 1855. However, Venkatanarasu, an associate of Brown, had printed an annotated version in 1887 (reprinted in 1907), but had deliberately dropped a few erotic verses and also the prologue from the original version as he had considered them inappropriate to the then prevailing social norms. The prologue which he had deleted was related to the devadasi tradition that had been adopted by Nagarathnamma's mother and grandmother. This exclusion was particularly disliked by Nagarthnamma and she made efforts to get the original version written on palm leaves. Once she found the original version, she reedited the Radhika Santawanam, which fully conformed to the palm leaf manuscript version. In 1910, she published this book with a preface in which she noted that she had read and reread the poetic verses of the book several times for its aesthetic quality. The book, published 150 years after the original manuscript was written by Muddupalani in Telugu, was reviewed by Kandukuri Veeresalingam, who, though a supporter of women's causes, attacked some of the erotic contents of the book as totally "inappropriate for women to hear let alone be uttered from a woman's mouth." Nagarathnamma strongly defended her version of the book and counterattacked saying that there was very much more titillating content included in the book titled Vaijayantivilasam, which the critic (Veeresalingam) had reviewed and accepted for printing. She protested against this double standard and wondered "Does the question of propriety and embarrassment apply only in the case of women and not men".

Muddupalani's Radhika Santawanam, edited by Nagarathnamma, was published but received criticism, with one Telugu magazine even noting that "a devadasi had composed the book and another devadasi had edited it." Following the adverse reaction to the book, it was banned. However, with the intervention by Raja Venkatagiri the issue was "soft-pedaled". It was alleged that it was a vindictive action by the Veerasilingham lobby, as books with much more suggestive content had been published. However, after India attained independence the ban on the book was lifted by Tanguturi Prakasam, the then Chief Minister of Madras, with a comment that "he was restoring a few pearls to the necklace of Telugu literature".

== Death ==
Nagarathnamma, in 1951, saw Thyagaraja in a dream or vision and he directed her to Venkatagiri where she saw her Lord Rama in Sathya Sai Baba, swooning and falling in the process. She sought Baba's blessings and stated that she had seen her Lord. Sai Baba: Invitation to Glory by Howard Murphet Nagarathnamma died in 1952 at the age of 74; a memorial in her honour was erected next to Thyagaraja's samadhi.

== Bibliography ==
- C. P. Ramaswami Aiyar Foundation (1980). Voice of Samanvaya. C. P. Ramaswami Aiyar Foundation.
- Chandra, Vikram (2 September 2014). Geek Sublime: The Beauty of Code, the Code of Beauty. Graywolf Press. ISBN 978-1-55597-326-1.
- Kramarae, Cheris; Spender, Dale (27 December 2000). Routledge International Encyclopaedia of Women 4 Volume Set: Global Women's Issues and Knowledge. Routledge. ISBN 978-1-135-96315-6.
- McGonigal, Mike (5 April 2010). Yeti 9. Verse Chorus Press. ISBN 978-0-9788786-9-6.
- Muthiah, S (2011). Madras Miscellany. Westland. ISBN 978-93-80032-84-9.
- Paḷani, Muddu (2011). The Appeasement of Radhika. Penguin Books India. ISBN 978-0-14-341743-9.
- Ramamirthammal, Muvalar; Kannabiran, Kalpana; Kannabiran, Vasantha (2003). Muvalur Ramamirthammal's Web of Deceit: Devadasi Reform in Colonial India. Zubaan. ISBN 978-81-86706-63-3.
