= Mahari dance =

Type of dance

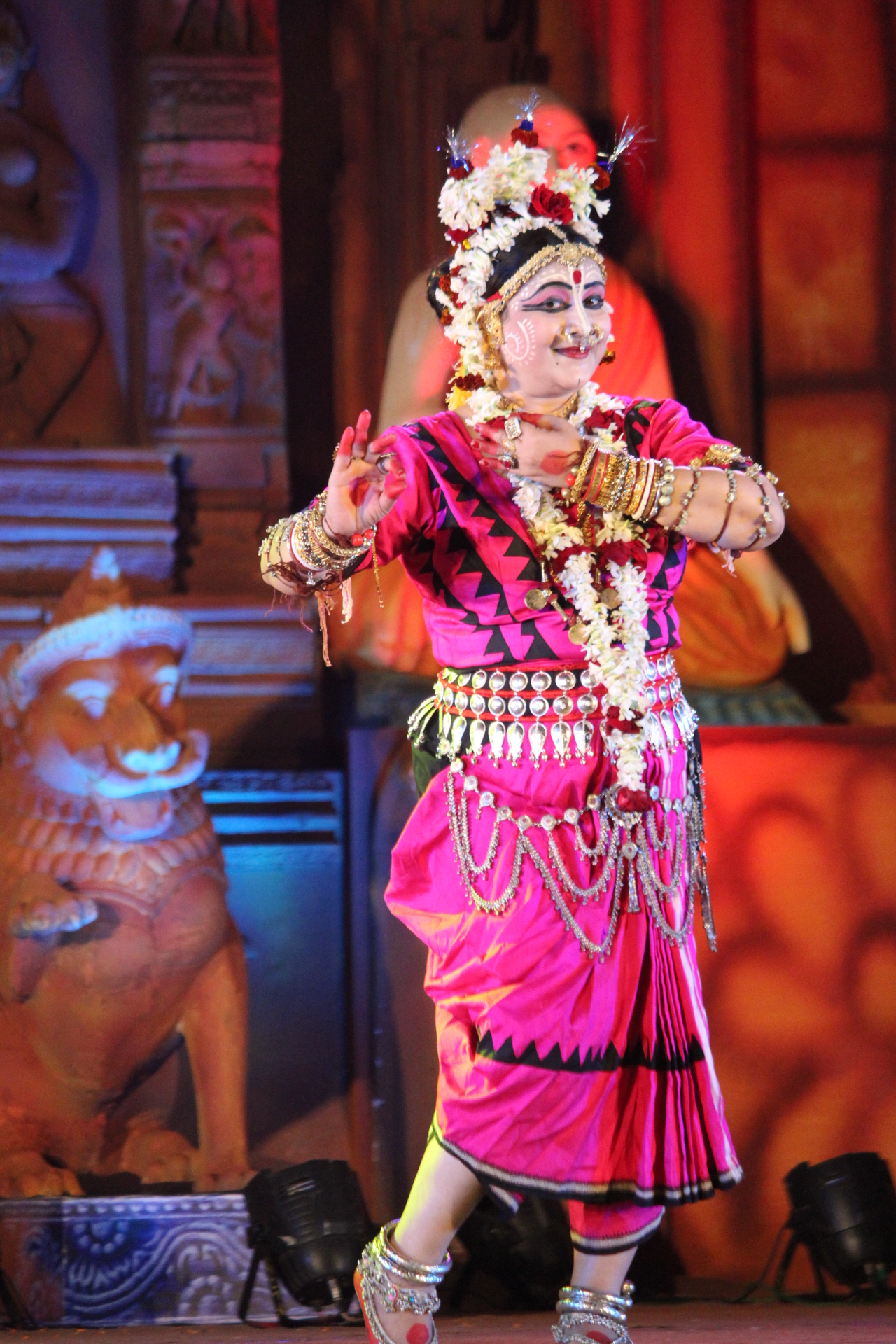
Mahari dance, one of the important dance forms of Odisha, gave birth to the modern classical dance form of Odissi

Mahari is a ritualistic dance form from the eastern Indian state of Odisha that used to be performed at the temple of Lord Jagannatha at Puri by devadasi dancers called mahari. Following the abolition of the devadasi system, the dance has been discontinued at the Jagannatha Temple but is now performed on stage at many venues. The Mahari dance spurred the development of both Odissi and the Gotipua dance forms of Odisha. The Maharis have been among the foremost exponents of both traditional Odia dance and Odissi music.

== History ==
Mahari dance is nearly thousand years old with dance having been an integral part of the daily rituals at the Jagannath temple of Puri since the time of Ganga rulers of Utkala. In the twelfth century, Chodaganga Deva gave the dance a legal status, establishing new localities for the maharis to stay and introduced new ceremonies for the deity. The classical dance form of Odissi has its roots in the Mahari dance while the Gotipua dance originated as an offshoot of the Mahari tradition when it went into decline in the fifteenth and sixteenth centuries. The Gotipua and the Mahari dances were patronized by Ramachandra, the Raja of Khurda and it is from his time that the devadasis who until then were attached only to temples came to be patronized by royal courts. With the abolition of the devadasi system in independent India, Mahari dance entered a period of steady decline. Its revival and adaptation for stage performances are credited to the late Odissi doyen Guru Pankaj Charan Das. The Odissi dancer Rupashri Mohapatra, a disciple of Pankaj Das, has also played a notable role in reviving Mahari. The dance was once taught exclusively to the maharis of the Jagannath Temple. The last of the professional maharis was Sashimani Devi.

== Maharis ==
Maharis were the temple dancers or devadasis of the Jagannath Temple at Puri and the dance takes its name after them. According to legend, Lord Jagannath enjoys a mahari dance recital before retiring to bed at night and the dancers performed the dance for his satisfaction. The maharis were given grants of land for their sustenance and they in turn behaved as the deity's spouse, singing and dancing the Gita Govinda of Jayadeva to please him. The Gita Govinda is ritually sung according to traditional ragas & talas of Odissi music, the traditional classical music of the state of Odisha. The deity himself used to be dressed up in specially woven saris containing verses from the Govinda weaved into them and the mahari, dressed in special jewelry and decked with flowers, performed exclusively for the deity. The term mahari stands for maha-nari meaning 'great lady'. The Maharis performed exclusively for the deity in the sanctum sanctorum as part of the daily rituals at the temple and occasionally at temple processions. In earlier times the maharis enjoyed a place of esteem in society and girls from elite families took it up as a respectable profession. The Maharis belonged to six groups namely Bhitara Gauni, Bahara Gauni, Nachuani, Patuari, Raj Angila, Gahana Mahari and Rudra Ganika. Since the abolition of the devadasi system, the dance has been discontinued at the Jagannath Temple.

== Mahari Award ==
The Mahari Award is an award instituted by Guru Pankaj Charan Odissi Research Foundation. In 2012, it was awarded to the Odissi dancer Minati Pradhan.
