= Devadasi =

Woman dedicated to the worship of a temple's patron god

- Female servant of a god
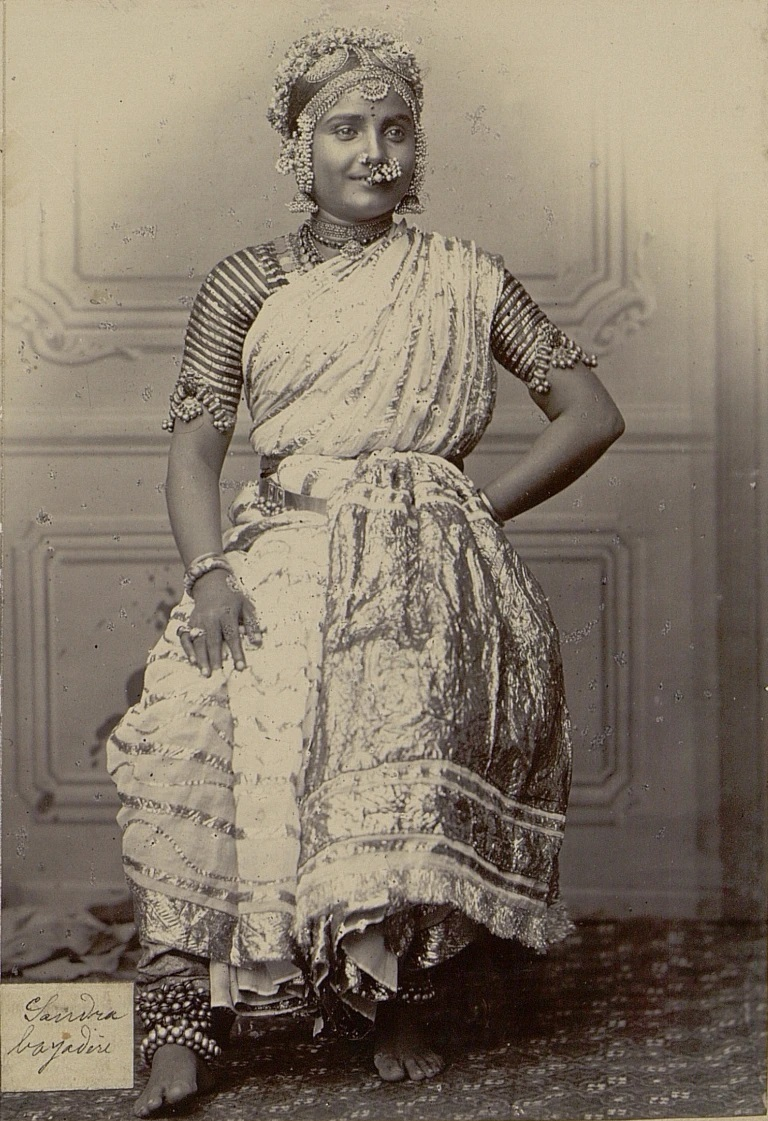
- Devadasi named Gnyana of Tanjore, 19th century
- Formation: around Gupta period
- Type: Temple priestess
- Headquarters: no central authority
- Region served: Indian Subcontinent
- Members: 44,000 to 250,000 (2006)
- Ministry: Temple services (including rituals, music, dance)

A Devadasi is a woman dedicated to the worship of a temple's patron god. The dedication takes place in a ceremony that is somewhat similar to a marriage ceremony. They have been variously described as female artists who take care of the temple, perform rituals and learn and practice classical Indian dances such as Bharatanatyam, Mohiniyattam, Kuchipudi, and Odissi, but also as de facto sex slaves forced into temple prostitution.

Between the sixth and thirteenth centuries, Devadasis had a high rank and dignity in society and were exceptionally affluent as they were seen as the protectors of the arts. During this period, royal patrons provided them with gifts of land, property, and jewellery. After becoming Devadasis, the women would spend their time learning religious rites, rituals and dances. Devadasis were expected to live a life of celibacy.

During the period of British rule in the Indian subcontinent, kings who were the patrons of temples lost their power, thus the temple artist communities also lost their significance. As a result, Devadasis were left without their traditional means of support and patronage and were now commonly associated with prostitution. The practice of Devadasi was banned during British rule, starting with the Bombay Devadasi Protection Act in 1934. The colonial view of Devadasi practices remains debated as the British colonial government were unable to distinguish the Devadasis from non-religious street dancers.

The Devadasi system is still in existence in rudimentary form, but under pressure from social activism at different times, some state governments have outlawed it, such as Andhra Pradesh with its 1988 Devdasis (Prohibition of Dedication) Act and Madras with its 1947 Devdasis Act.

== History ==
The practice became significant when one of the great queens of the Somavamshi dynasty decided that in order to honour the gods, certain women who were trained in classical dancing, should be married to the deities. The inception of the practice was one that was imbued with great respect as the women who were chosen to become Devadasi or Devidasi were subject to two great honors: first, because they were literally married to the deity, they were to be treated as if they were the goddess Lakshmi herself, and second, the women were honored because they were considered to be "those great women who (could) control natural human impulses, their five senses and [could] submit themselves completely to God." As they were married to an immortal, the women were considered to be auspicious. Their main duties, in addition to committing to a life without marriage (to a mortal, in the common, popular sense), were to take care of a temple and learn classical Indian dances, usually the Bharatanatyam, which they would perform at temple rituals. Patrons were considered to have higher status for their ability to financially sponsor Devadasis.

According to temple worship rules, or Agamas, dance and music are the necessary aspects of daily puja for temple deities. Devadasis were known by various local terms such as Basavi in Karnataka, Matangi in Maharashtra, and Kalavantin in Goa and Damaon. Devadasis were also known as Jogini, Venkatasani, Nailis, Muralis and Theradiyan. Devadasi is sometimes referred to as a caste (varna); however some question the accuracy of this usage. "According to the devadasi themselves there exists a devdasi 'way of life' or 'professional ethic' (vritti, murai) but not a devadasi jāti (sub-caste). Later, the office of devdasi became hereditary but it did not confer the right to work without adequate qualification" (Amrit Srinivasan, 1985). In Europe the term bayadere (from French: bayadère, from Portuguese: balhadeira, literally dancer) was occasionally used.

=== Ancient and medieval period ===
The definite origin of the Devadasi or Devidasi tradition is murky due to its early inception. Many scholars have noted that the tradition has no basis in scriptures. A. S. Altekar states that, "the custom of association of dancing girls with temples is unknown to Jataka literature. It is not mentioned by Greek writers, and the Arthashastra, which describes in detail the life of Ganika, is silent about it."

The tradition of female artists in temples is said to have developed during the 3rd century CE. A reference to such dancers is found in the Meghadūta of Kālidāsa, a classical poet and Sanskrit writer of the Gupta Empire. An example of reference to a Devadasi in the 3rd century CE in South India is Madhavi found in the Silappadikaram. Other sources include the works of authors such as Xuanzang, a Chinese traveller, and Kalhana, a Kashmiri historian. An inscription dated to the 11th century suggests that there were 400 Devadasis attached to the Thanjavur temple in South India. Similarly, there were 500 Devadasis at the Someshvara shrine of Gujarat. Between the 6th and 13th centuries, Devadasis had a high rank and dignity in society and were exceptionally affluent as they were seen as the protectors of the arts. During this period royal patrons provided them with gifts of land, property, and jewellery.

==== Devdasis in South India and the Chola Empire and Vijayanagara Empire ====
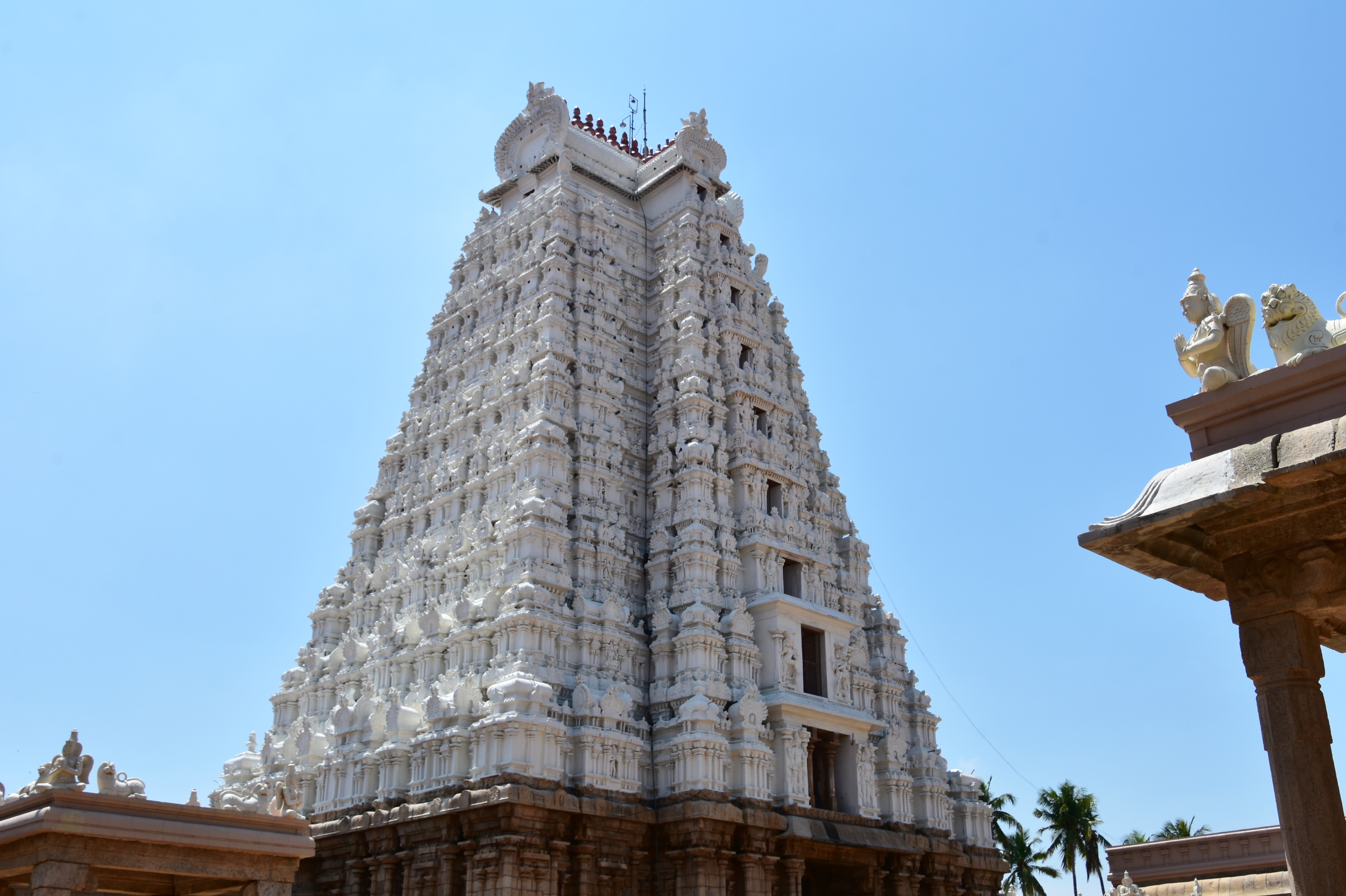
Vellayi Gopuram in Srirangam; one of the temple gateways named after devadasi Vellayi in 14th century.

The Chola empire supported the Devadasi system; in Tamil Devadasis were known as Devar Adigalar ("Deva" means "Divine" and "Adigalar" "Servants", i.e. "Servants of the Divine"). Both male and female Devadasas and Devadasis were dedicated to the service of Hindu temples and their deities. The Chola empire developed the tradition of music and dance employed during temple festivals.

Inscriptions indicate that 400 dancers, along with their gurus and orchestras, were maintained by the Brihadisvara temple, Thanjavur, with munificent grants including the daily disbursement of oil, turmeric, betel leaves, and nuts. Nattuvanars were the male accompanists of the Devadasis during their performances. The Nattuvanars conducted the orchestra while the Devadasi performed her service. Inscriptions indicate that Nattuvanars taught the Chola queen and princess Kundavai.

As the Chola empire expanded in wealth and size, more temples were built throughout the country. Soon other empresses and emperors started imitating the Chola empire and adopted Devadasi systems of their own.

Portuguese traveler Domingo Paes who visited Vijayanagara Empire in 16th century describes the presence of Devadasis in the empire.

The women begin to dance, while some of them place themselves in the circular galleries that I have said were (erected) at their gate of entrance. Who can fitly describe to you the great riches these women carry on their persons? – collars of gold with so many diamonds and rubies and pearls, bracelets also on their arms and on their upper arms, girdles below, and of necessity anklets on the feet. The marvel should be otherwise, namely that women of such a profession should obtain such wealth; but there are women among them who have lands that have been given to them, and litters, and so many maid-servants that one cannot number all their things. There is a woman in this city who is said to have a hundred thousand pardaos and I believe this from what I have seen of them. These women live in the best streets that there are in the city; it is the same in all their cities, their streets have the best rows of houses. They are very much esteemed, and are classed amongst those honored ones who are the mistresses of the captains; any respectable man may go to their houses without any blame attaching thereto. These women (are allowed) even to enter the presence of the wives of the king, and they stay with them and eat betel with them, a thing which no other person may do, no matter what his rank may be.

=== Natavalollu ===
A community of Karnataka living in Andhra Pradesh, the Natavalollu were are also known as Nattuvaru, Bogam, Bhogam, and Kalavanthulu.

It was customary in the Krishna district of Tenali for each family to give one girl to the Devadasi system. These dancers were known as Devadasis. As part of a social reform, a written agreement was made to formally end the practice.

Ādapāpas were female attendants to the ladies of the families of Zamindars. Ādapāpas were not allowed to marry. In some places such as the Krishna and Godāvari districts, Ādapāpas were known as Khasa or Khasavandlu.

Natavalollu/Kalawants were a community that was distributed throughout the state of Andhra Pradesh. They were also referred to as Devadasi, Bogamvallu, Ganikulu, and Sani. Kalavantulu means one who is engaged in art. Davesh Soneji writes that, "By the early twenty-first century, large numbers of women in the Kalavanthulu community had converted to Christianity, because this promised them a stable monthly income as members of the new rehabilitation programs of these missions."

==== Mahari Devadasi of Odisha ====
In the eastern state of Odisha Devadasis were known colloquially as Maharis of the Jagannath temple complex. The term Devadasi referred to the women who danced inside the temple. Devadasi, or mahari, means "those great women who can control natural human impulses, their five senses and can submit themselves completely to God (Vachaspati)". Mahari is a contraction of Mahan Nari, translating to, "the woman belonging to God". Chaitanya had defined Devadasis as Sebayatas who served God through dance and music. Pankaj Charan Das, the oldest guru of Odissi classical dance and who comes from a Mahari family, defines Mahari as Maha Ripu-Ari, one who conquers the six main ripus – enemies.

Unlike other parts of India, the Odia Mahari Devadasis were never sexually liberal and were expected to remain celibate upon becoming Devadasis. However, there are records of Odia Mahari Devadasi having relationships and children. It is said that the daughters of the Maharis of the Jagannath temple took to other professions such as nursing in the mid-20th century due to stigma attached to their inherent profession, as dance was frowned up during the colonial era.

The 1956 Orissa Gazette lists nine Devadasis and eleven temple musicians. By 1980, only four Devadasis were left – Harapriya, Kokilaprabha, Parashmani, and Shashimani. By 1998, only Shashimani and Parashmani were still alive. The daily ritualistic dance had stopped, although Shashimani and Parashmani served in a few of the yearly temple rituals such as Nabakalebara, Nanda Utsava, and Duara Paka during Bahuda Jatra. The last of the Devadasis, Shashimani, died on 19 March 2015, at the age of 92.

==== Yellamma Cult of Karnataka in South India ====
In the southern Indian state of Karnataka the Devadasi system was practiced for over 10 centuries. Chief among them was the Yellamma cult.

There are many stories about the origin of the Yellamma cult. The most popular story indicates that Renuka was the daughter of a Brahmin, who married the sage Jamadagni, and was the mother of five sons. She used to bring water from the Malaprabha river for the sage's worship and rituals. One day at the river she saw a group of youths engaged in water sports and forgot to return home in time for her husband's worship and rituals, which made Jamadagni question her chastity. He ordered their sons one by one to punish their mother, but four of them refused on one pretext or the other. The sage cursed them to become eunuchs and had Renuka beheaded by his fifth son, Parashurama. To everybody's astonishment, Renuka's head multiplied by tens and hundreds and moved to different regions. This miracle inspired her four eunuch sons as well as others to become her followers and worship her head. A variant of this story has less sons and features gandharva as the reason Yellamma was home late. She habitually was able to form loose sand into a pot with magic created by her chastity, but when she stared at the gandharva, the sand crumbled, dousing her in water.

=== Colonial era ===
==== Reformists and abolitionists ====
Reformists and abolitionists considered the Devadasi a social evil due to their way of life, which had very widely degenerated into a system of prostitution. The first anti-Nautch and anti-dedication movement began in 1882, even though the British colonial authorities officially maintained most brothels in India. The Irish missionary Amy Carmichael was active in helping Devadasi women to escape their situation.

As the Devadasi were equated with prostitutes, they also became associated with the spread of the venereal disease syphilis in India. During the British colonial period many British soldiers were exposed to venereal diseases in brothels, and Devadasis were misunderstood to be responsible. In an effort to control the spread of venereal disease the British Government mandated that all prostitutes register themselves. Devadasis were required to register, as they were thought to be prostitutes by the British Government.

In addition to obligatory registration, the British Government also established institutions known as Lock Hospitals where women were brought in order to be treated for venereal diseases. However, many of the women admitted to these hospitals, including many Devadasi, were identified through the registry and then forcibly brought to the hospitals. A number of these women were confined in the hospitals permanently.

Today, Sitavva Joddati of Karnataka helps former Devadasi find a foothold in mainstream society. In 1982 she was made a Devadasi at age seven. In 1997 she began the non-governmental organisation MASS (Mahila Abhivrudhi-Samrakshana Sansthe) in the Belagavi district of Ghataprabha to help women like her escape the Devadasi system and live a life of dignity. Between 1997 and 2017 MASS helped over 4,800 Devadasis reintegrate into mainstream society. In 2018 she received the Padmashri award at age 43.

==== Evolution of Bharatanatyam ====
Rukmini Devi Arundale, a theosophist trained in ballet, sought to re-appropriate the Devadasi dance traditions in a context perceived respectably by Indian society which had by then adopted the western morales. She altered the dance repertoire to exclude pieces perceived as erotic in their description of a deity. She also systematized the dance in a way that incorporated the extension and use of space associated with dance traditions such as ballet. The product of this transformation was a new version of Bharatanatyam, which she taught professionally at the Kalakshetra school she established in Madras. Bharatanatyam is commonly seen as a very ancient dance tradition associated with the Natyashastra. However, Bharatanatyam as it is performed and known today is actually a product of Arundale's recent endeavour to remove the Devadasi dance tradition from the perceived immoral context associated with the Devadasi community and bring it into the upper caste performance milieu. She also adopted a lot of technical elements of ballet into the modified form of Bharatanatyam. To give the dance form a measure of respect E Krishna Iyer and Rukmini Devi Arundale proposed a resolution at a 1932 meeting of the Madras Music Academy to rename Sadirattam to "Bharatanatyam" or Indian dance.

=== Legislative Initiatives ===
The first legal initiative to outlaw the Devadasi system dates back to the 1934 Bombay Devadasi Protection Act. This act pertained to the Bombay province as it existed in the British Raj. The Bombay Devadasi Protection Act made dedication of women illegal, whether consensual or not. In 1947, the year of Indian independence, the Madras Devadasi (Prevention of Dedication) Act outlawed dedication in the southern Madras Presidency. The Devadasi system was formally outlawed in all of India in 1988, although social and economic pressures on mostly Dalit families have ensured that the Devadasi system is still widely practiced illegally. The Scheduled Castes and the Scheduled Tribes (Prevention of Atrocities) Amendment Act (SC/ST) includes dedicating an SC/ST woman as Devadasi as an atrocity.

== Devadasi practices ==
From the late medieval period until 1910, the Pottukattu or tali-tying dedication ceremony, was a widely advertised community event requiring the full cooperation of the local religious authorities. It initiated a young girl into the Devadasi profession and was performed in the temple by a priest. The dedication was a symbolic "marriage" of the pubescent girl to the temple's deity.

In the Sadanku or puberty ceremonies, the Devadasi initiate began her marriage with an emblem of the god borrowed from the temple as a stand-in bridegroom (Devadasis may be married to goddesses as well as gods, depending on the regional practices, but even goddesses are frequently called "husband"). From then onward, the Devadasi was considered a Nitya Sumangali, a woman eternally free from the adversity of widowhood. She would then perform her ritual and artistic duties in the temple. The puberty ceremonies were not only a religious occasion, but also a community feast and celebration in which the local elites also participated.

While many Devadasis are women who were assigned female at birth, in South India some Devadasis (though this term is not the one typically used by the community in this region for anyone) are transgender women. Both are typically of a Dalit background.

Devadasis in South India would begin sex work after puberty, either by having a high caste patron (typically a single lifelong partner who sired children considered to belong to the Devadasi's patrilineal family) in villages, or a cash based brothel system in towns. A good patron, while not expected to claim his children, would support them and help them get an education and marriage. Having a patron overall became less common in the 1980s.

Devadasis have some of the social responsibilities and privileges of sons. They are expected to financially support their family, pass on their name and property to their children, arrange marriages, pay for jobs, purchase land, and build houses.

== Social status ==
A Devadasi was believed to be immune from widowhood and was called Akhanda Saubhagyavati ("woman who never separated from good fortune"). Since she was wedded to a divine deity, she was supposed to be one of the especially welcome guests at weddings and was regarded as a bearer of good fortune. At weddings, people would receive a string of the tali (wedding lock) prepared by her, threaded with a few beads from her own necklace. The presence of a Devadasi on any religious occasion in the house of a Dvija member was regarded as sacred and she was treated with due respect, and was presented with gifts.

== Notable members from the Devadasi community ==
- Bangalore Nagarathnamma
- Coimbatore Thayi
- R Muthukannammal
- Anjanibai Malpekar
- Kesarbai Kerkar
- Moghubai Kurdikar
- Gangubai Hangal
- Kanchipuram Dhanakoti Ammal
- Balasaraswati
- Veenai Dhanammal, a carnatic vocalist and a performer on the Saraswati veena.
- Thanjavur Brinda and her sister Thanjavur Muktha, carnatic vocalists
- M.S. Subbulakshmi
- Mylapore Gowri Ammal
- Phuleshwari
- Muddupalani, author of Rādhikā-sāntvanam
- Parasmani Debi
- Sasimani Debi
- Muthulakshmi Reddy
- Moovalur Ramamirtham
- T. Ranganathan
- T. Viswanathan
- Gemini Ganesan
- M. L. Vasanthakumari
- Lata Mangeshkar

== Contemporary statistical data ==
Indian National Commission for Women, which is mandated to protect and promote the welfare of women, collected information on the prevalence of Devadasi culture in various states. The government of Odisha stated that the Devadasi system is not prevalent in the state. In March 2015, Sasimani Debi, the last Devadasi attached to Jagannath temple, died thus bringing the curtain down on the institution.

Similarly, the government of Tamil Nadu wrote that this system has been eradicated and there are now no Devadasis in the state. Andhra Pradesh has identified 16,624 Devadasis within its state. The Karnataka State Women's University found more than 80,000 Devadasis in Karnataka in 2018; while a government study found 40,600 in 2008. The government of Maharashtra did not provide the information as sought by the commission. However, the state government provided statistical data regarding the survey conducted by them to sanction a "Devadasi Maintenance Allowance". A total of 8,793 applications were received and after conducting a survey 6,314 were rejected and 2,479 Devadasis were declared eligible for the allowance. At the time of sending the information, 1,432 Devadasis were receiving this allowance.

According to a study by the Joint Women's Programme of Bangalore for National Commission for Women, girls who have to accept becoming a Devadasi, few reasons were provided, which included dumbness, deafness, poverty, and others. The life expectancy of Devadasi girls is low compared to the average of the country, with few being over fifty.

== In popular culture ==
Year	Title and description	Medium
1810	Les bayadères, a French opera in three acts. Music by Charles-Simon Catel, libretto by Victor-Joseph Étienne de Jouy, based on Voltaire's L'éducation d'un prince.	opera
1976	Bala a documentary on dance performance of Balasaraswati, directed by Satyajit Ray. A joint production of the Government of Tamil Nadu and the National Centre for the Performing Arts.	documentary
1984	Giddh. Movie portraying the theme of exploitation of young girls in the name of Devadasi tradition. Set in villages of Maharashtra and Karnataka. Starring Om Puri and Smita Patil.	movie
1987	Mahananda, a Hindi film on the life of a Devadasi in Maharashtra, Produced and directed by Mohan Kavia.	documentary
2000-2001	Krishnadasi. Television series on SunTV, based on Tamil novel Krishnadasi by Indra Soundar Rajan.	TV series
2002-2006	Rudra Veenai. Television series on SunTV. A Devadasi lineage with a critical role in the story that revolves around a mysterious musical instrument.	TV series
2009	Jogwa, a national award-winning Marathi feature film; a love story revolving around Dev Dasi.	movie
2011	Sex, Death, and the Gods, a BBC Storyville documentary series directed by Beeban Kidron	documentary series
2011	Balasaraswati: Her Art and Life. A biography of Balasaraswati.	book
2012	Prostitutes of God. A controversial documentary on the lives of Devadasi sex workers. The Vice Guide to Travel	documentary
2016	Krishnadasi. Television series on Colors TV depicting the lives of Devadasis married to Krishna.	documentary series
2016	Agnijal Television series on Star Jalsha. A Bengali romantic drama between a King and a Devadasi.	TV series
2021	Shyam Singha Roy, Telugu supernatural drama-thriller that includes the sexual exploitation of young Devadasis in the late 1960s in West Bengal. Starring Nani and Sai Pallavi.	movie
2024	The Shameless, Hindi-language thriller by Bulgarian director Konstantin Bojanov featuring a Devadasi protagonist played by Omara Shetty.	movie

== See also ==
- Isai Vellalar
- Sacred prostitution
- Child prostitution
- Nagarvadhu
- Deuki
- Shamakhi dancers
- Gomantak Maratha Samaj
- Tawaif
- Nauch
- Chakyars and Nangyarammas of Kerala
- Kanjirottu Yakshi
- Muthulakshmi Reddy
- Hemalatha Lavanam
- Bene Gesserit
- Rudrakanyas
