= Mangammal chatram, Kodumbalur =

Mangammal chatram is a chatram located at Kodumbalur in Pudukkottai district, Tamil Nadu, India.

== Location ==
Known as Kodumbalur chatram, it is located on the Viralimalai-Madurai road.

== Structure ==
This chatram was built by Queen Regent Mangammal in the 17th century CE, for the use of people going from Madurai to Trichy and vice versa, for taking rest, boarding and lodging. It contains many artworks. The structure has beautiful pillars with arches, similar to those found in palaces. It serves as a showcase of the architectural skill of the artisans of that period.

== Present status ==
Later, it was changed into an educational institution. For some years, it housed a middle school. As a new school building was built nearby, the school was moved there, and the building was abandoned and not maintained properly. Historical enthusiasts have called for proper maintenance of the building.
