= Nagarathnamma =

Nagarathnamma is a surname. Notable people with this surname include:

- Bangalore Nagarathnamma (1878–1952), Indian singer, activist, and scholar
- K. S. Nagarathnamma (1923–1993), Indian politician
- R. Nagarathnamma (1926–2012), Indian theatre personality
