= Bombay Devadasi Protection Act =

Bombay Devadasi Protection Act (1934) was passed by the Bombay High Court under British India to protect existing the rights of Devadasis and prevent the dedication of women into the Devadasi system of existence. The act extended to the whole state of Maharashtra, and was part of other state laws to protect Devadasis, such as the Madras Devadasis (Prevention of Dedication) Act, Bombay Protection (Extension) Act, and the Andhra Pradesh Devadasi (Prohibition of Dedication) Act.
