= Gana =

Sanskrit and Pali word

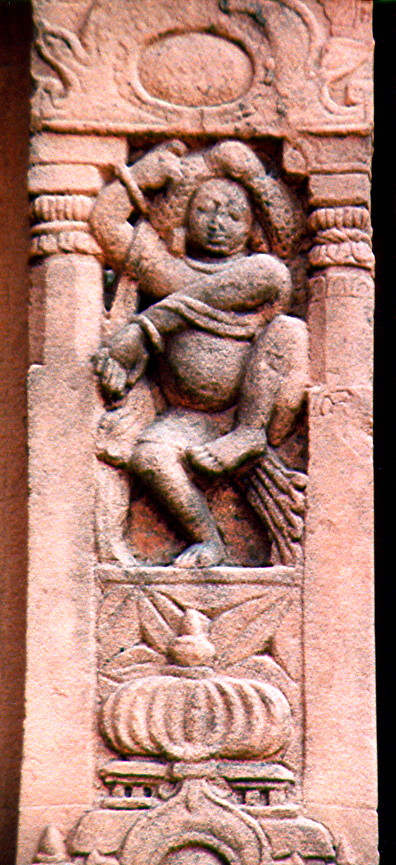
A dancing gana, Deogarh

In Hinduism, the Gaṇas are attendants of Shiva and live on Mount Kailash. Ganesha was chosen as their leader by Shiva; the deity's title is gaṇeśa or gaṇapati, meaning, "lord or leader of the ganas". They are referred to as Shivaganas or Rudraganas and Rudraganikas are considered the female equivalents.

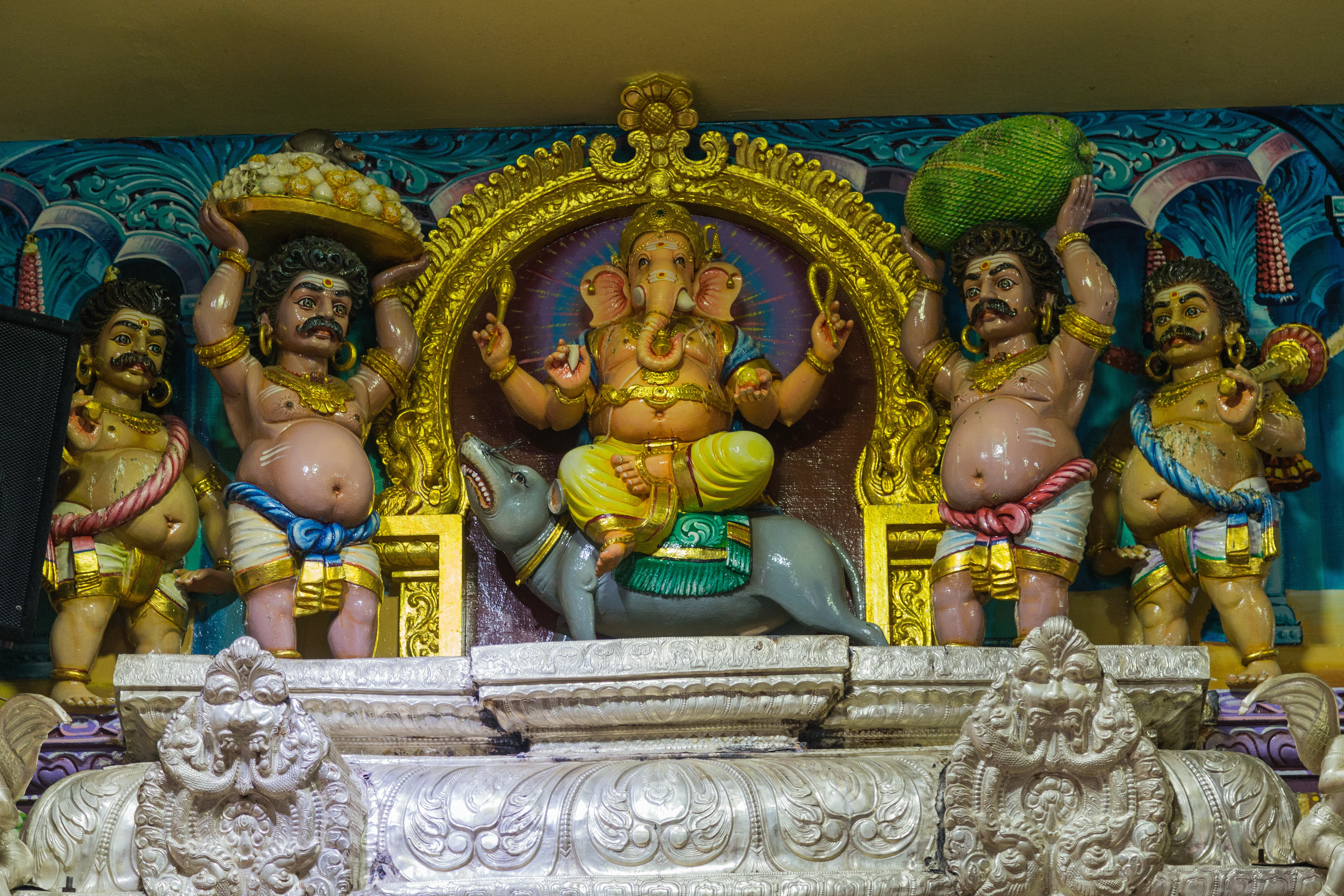
Ganesha, the leader of the ganas, surrounded by them

The word gaṇa (Sanskrit: गण Sanskrit pronunciation: [ɡɐ.ɳɐ́]) in Sanskrit and Pali means "flock, troop, multitude, number, tribe, category, series, or clan". It can also be used to refer to a "body of attendants" and can refer to "a company, any assemblage or association of men formed for the attainment of the same aims".

The word "gana" can also refer to councils or assemblies convened to discuss matters of religion or other topics.

== Literature ==
=== Vedas ===
The term gana is employed in the Rigveda in reference to the Maruts:

śardhaṃ-śardhaṃ va eṣāṃ vrātaṃ-vrātaṃ gaṇaṃ-gaṇaṃ suśastibhiḥ |
anu krāmema dhītibhiḥ ||

— Verse 5.53.11

Let us wait with sacred praises and holy rites upon your several strength, and separate troop, and individual company.

=== Mahabharata ===
Chapter 108 of the Shanti Parva of the Mahabharata describes a discussion between Yudhishthira and Bhishma regarding the strength of the ganas, how they defend themselves from disunion, the subjugation of their enemies, and forging friendships. Bhishma's answers to these questions are recorded in the form of shlokas (verses) from 16 – 32 of the chapter.

=== Shiva Purana ===
In the Shiva Purana, after Ganesha's life was restored by Shiva, he was crowned as the leader of the ganas by the gods.

=== Cilappatikaram ===
The Cilappatikaram of Ilango Adigal, one of the Five Great Epics in Tamil, describes the prescribed offering for eighteen kind of ganas.

=== Buddhaghosa ===
The Buddhaghosa mentions the palaces of the ganadeva-puttas ("Ganadevaputtānañ ca vimānāni") among those seen by King Nemi as Mātali led him through the world of the devas. This term seems to be absent in the corresponding jātaka. It is possible that these deities are associated with the ganas of Hinduism.

== See also ==
- Gaṇasaṅgha
- Ganachakra
- Ganatantra
- Ganesha
- Genos
- Bhoota
