= Muddu =

Muddu (Telugu: ముద్దు) in Telugu language means Kiss.

- Muddu Bidda is a 1956 Telugu Drama film directed and produced by K. B. Tilak.
- Muddu Palani was a Telugu speaking poet and devadasi attached to the court of Pratap Singh, the Maratha king of Tanjore.
