= Rudrakanyas =

Shaivite religious community of temple dancers

Rudrakanyas (also known as Rudraganikas) are a historical and religious community of women in the Shaivite and Shakta traditions of Hinduism who dedicated their lives to the service of Shiva and Parvati, primarily through the performance of sacred dance (Nṛtya) and music in temples.

== Mythology and origins ==
According to the Skanda Purana, Rudrakanyas are described as the "daughters of Rudra." They were born out of the divine admiration shown by the wives of the sages (ṛṣīs) in the Devataruvana forest when they beheld the beautiful form of Shiva resplendent in auspicious adornments. A second tradition found in the Padma Purana describes them as celestial maidens (Apsaras) created by Rudra specifically for the sake of the sage Kauśika, forming the lineage known as the vaṃśa of Rudraganika.

In the Shiva Purana, the term is also used as an epithet for the Narmada River, personifying the river as the "daughter of Rudra" (rudrakanyā) who joyfully attends the marriage of Shiva and Śivā.

Rudraganikas are also mentioned in 7th Century work Sivadarmottara (2.163–166) and similar works in places as far away as Cambodia. Many scholars believe the origin of the term to be the female equivalent of Rudraganas or the armies of Shiva and not always to do with dancing or the arts.

== Ritualistic roles and initiation ==
In the Shaiva Agamas, particularly the Kamika and Ajita Agamas, the Rudrakanya played a central role in temple liturgy. The Karanagama puts them as the highest of seven types of women belonging to Shiva namely given, sold, servant, devotee, bought, almkara dasika and Rudrakayas. They were trained in the 64 arts including singing, dance, art, drama, linguistics. Their primary duty was the performance of Saukhyakarma—a classical dance offering accompanied by the Panchacharyas (temple priests). This was considered a mandatory form of Arcana (worship) to Shiva during:

- Nityotsava (daily festivals)
- Sthapana (consecration rituals)
- Snapana (ritual bathing of the deity)
- Dhvajarohana (flag hoisting ceremony)

Unlike secular dancers, Rudrakanyas were required to undergo formal spiritual initiation (Diksha) performed by a qualified Ācārya. Upon initiation, they were honored with new clothes and ornaments and were provided a regular wage (bhṛti) for their service to the temple.

== Socio-historical status ==
The Rudrakanya tradition is part of the broader Devadasi system, but specifically denotes those attached to Shiva temples (as opposed to Vaishnava Manikanyas). Historical inscriptions, such as those found in the SITI (South Indian Temple Inscriptions) glossary, identify the Rudraganika as an eminent pillar of temple society. Epigraphical records from the Chola and Vijayanagara periods show that these women were often landowners, patrons of the arts, and significant contributors to the local economy.

During the British colonial era, the status of temple-dancer communities was attacked and underwent a significant decline. Socio-religious reform movements in the 19th and early 20th centuries, influenced by Western Victorian morality and the Anti-Nautch movement, reclassified these religious practitioners as secular courtesans. This shift in perception led to the eventual abolition of the system through legal acts, such as the Madras Devadasis (Prevention of Dedication) Act. Relevant scholarly works by Ananda Kentish Coomaraswamy and modern researchers like R. Nagaswamy provide further context on the cultural depth of this lineage.

== See also ==
- Devadasi
- Shaivism
- Indian classical dance
- Nataraja
