= Sundaram Krishnamurthy =

Indian physician, surgeon, and oncologist

- Born: 12 September 1919; Madras, Madras Presidency, British India
- Died: 2 July 2010 (aged 90); Chennai, Tamil Nadu, India
- Education: University of Madras
- Occupations: physician, surgeon, oncologist
- Children: 2
- Parents: Sundara Reddy (father); Muthulakshmi Reddy (mother)
- Medical career
- Institutions: Ellis Fischel Cancer Center, Missouri; Royal Cancer Hospital, London; Government General Hospital, Madras; Adyar Cancer Institute, Chennai
- Sub-specialties: Oncology
- Awards: Padma Shri; 1971

Sundaram Krishnamurthy (12 September 1919 – 2 July 2010) was an Indian physician, surgeon, and oncologist. In recognition of his efforts in cancer research & treatment, he was honoured with the Padma Shri in 1971.

== Early life and education ==
Krishnamurthy was born on 12 September 1919 in Madras, Tamil Nadu, to Dr. Sundara Reddy and Dr. Muthulakshmi Reddy, figures in Indian medicine and social reform. He completed his Bachelor of Medicine and Bachelor of Surgery (MBBS) in 1942, followed by a Master of Science (M.Sc.) in 1946 from University of Madras.

== Medical career ==
In 1947, Krishnamurthy pursued advanced medical training abroad. He was a Fellow at the Ellis Fischel Cancer Hospital in Columbia, Missouri, United States, and later found a job at the Royal Cancer Hospital, London. When he informed his mother of his plans of moving to London, she sent a telegram claiming to be seriously ill. Rushing back to India, he found her in good health. She then reproached him, saying: “I sent you abroad to study so that you could come back and serve our people, not live comfortably in a foreign country”.

Upon returning to India, Krishnamurthy joined the cancer unit at the General Hospital, Madras. During his tenure, he encountered administrative challenges, including allegations of corruption, which ultimately led to his departure. He later joined the Cancer Institute, Adyar, a non-profit organization established by his mother, where he continued his work in oncology, focusing on patient care and research.

Krishnamurthy held several key positions at the Cancer Institute. He served as scientific director (1954–1959), director and scientific director (1959–1980), and vice-chairman from 1980 onward. At the time of his death, he was the adviser for research and planning at the institute. Additionally, he served as honorary surgeon to the president of India from 1987 to 1992.

His memberships included

- British Institute of Radiology
- Association of Pathologists of India
- Association of Surgeons of India
- Indian Radiological Association
- Indian Medical Association
- Indian Science Congress Association
- Indian Cancer Society

== Contributions ==
In 1971, he was awarded the Padma Shri, one of India's highest civilian honours, for his contributions to cancer research and treatment.

He also held prominent roles in global health initiatives. From 1965 to 1982, he served on several committees of the World Health Organization, providing expertise on cancer control and prevention. In 1983, he was appointed to the Advisory Committee on Cancer Control and Planning of the Government of India.

== Legacy ==
He died on 2 July 2010.
