= Sitavva Joddati =

Indian social activist

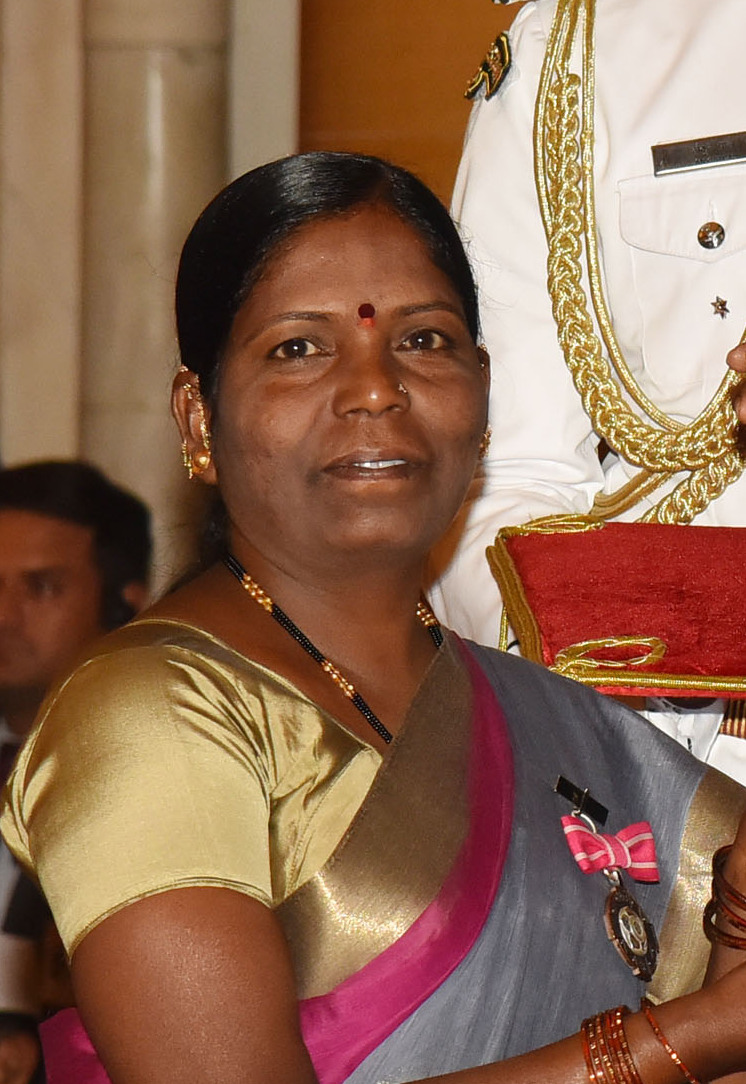
Image of Sitavva Joddati

Sitavva Joddati is a Karnataka-based social activist working for the emancipation and empowerment of women suffering within the Devadasi system. In 2018, she was conferred the Padma Sri, the fourth highest civilian award, by the President of India.

== Early life ==
Joddati was born in Kabbur village of Chikkodi Taluk in the Indian state of Karnataka. The youngest of six daughters, Sitavva was "promised" as a Devadasi to the community by her parents who believed that by doing this, they would be rewarded with a son.

After undergoing a religious ritual at the age of 7, Sitavva was made a Devadasi. By age 17, she had borne three children.

== Work ==
Sitavva met Latamala, the Managing Director of Women Development Corporation, in 1991 who made her realise how degrading the practice of Devadasi was to the dignity of women. Sitavva decided to save herself from the Devadasi system. She and the other Devadasis who used to travel to southern Maharashtra and northern Karnataka to attend religious fairs began to speak up against the practice, and within a week, the number of dissenters had risen to 45 women.

Soon after, Sitavva joined the Mahila Abhivrudhi Samrakshana Sansthe (MASS), an organisation dedicated to the eradication of the Devadasi system. Since then, she has rescued over 4,000 women and rehabilitated them with other jobs. She joined MASS when she was 17 and for over three decades, she has worked to uplift Devadasis and Dalits in Belgaum, Karnataka.

She is the CEO of MASS organisation since 2012. The organisation has around 4000 former Devadasis as members. Joddati conduct aids and legal workshops and programmes on women and child rights, financial management, STDs and other issues. She has created over 300 self-help groups (SHG) that provide financial support to former Devadasis, through banks and micro-lenders.

== Recognition ==
In March 2018, Joddati was conferred the fourth highest civilian honour of India, the Padma Sri, by the President of India, Ram Nath Kovind.
