= Coimbatore Thayi =

Indian female singer (1872–1917)

Coimbatore Thayi (1872–1917) was an Indian musician.

== Early life ==
Coimbatore Thayi was born in 1872 into a family of devadasis in Coimbatore. Thayi was the daughter of celebrated singer Vengamaal. She was named Palanikunjaram.Coimbatore Thayi's grandmother was also a devadasi. In this traditional devadasi family, her artistic career began with devadasi. Coimbatore Thayi showed great talent in music and dance from a young age, her mother was her first teacher in music and dance.Her first classical dance performance was at the age of 11. Affectionately referred to as "Thayi," she was introduced to sadir, which is now known as Bharatanatyam, and music at a young age. Thayi received rigorous training in music and dance, learning under various teachers and Kannada singer Mysore Kempe Gowda. Thayi's family moved to Georgetown, Madras in the 1890s, where Thayi gave up dancing and focused solely on music.

== Recording success and popularity ==
In 1910, Thayi was approached by The Gramophone Company to record songs, and she was one of their most popular artists, with a color-coded record of violet. Over the course of several recording sessions, Thayi produced nearly 60 recordings. She was honored in 1914 with a golden bracelet encrusted with diamonds and emeralds by the people of her hometown, Coimbatore, in recognition of her musical success.

Thayi was a prolific recording artist, producing nearly 300 records in her lifetime. Her recorded repertoire includes the compositions of the Trinity of Carnatic music, as well as sensuous padams and javalis, and Tamil devotionals. She played a key role in popularizing the devotional compositions of Ramalinga Swamigal Arulpa

Thayi died in 1917 at the age of 44.
