= Bogam =

Community in Telangana and Andhra Pradesh

Bogam (also known as Bhogam, Kalavantulu, or Sani) is a community historically associated with the performing arts and the Devadasi system in the Telugu-speaking regions of present-day Telangana and Andhra Pradesh. Traditionally, the community was dedicated to temple service and regional courtly entertainment, encompassing roles as musicians, dancers, and courtesans. In modern sociological classifications, they are often grouped under the broader non-Brahmin Kalavantulu demographic.

== Etymology ==
The term Bogam is a regional Telugu corruption of the Sanskrit word Bhogam, which translates historically to "enjoyer" or "a common woman" in colonial ethnographic accounts. The community is also referred to by several other titles, including Varangana, Kasban, Kalawant (practitioner of arts), Pathura Dawaru, and Tawaif. Members of the Hindu divisions often attach the titles Sani or Nayaka Sani to their names, while Muslim members use Jan and Nayakan.

== History and origins ==
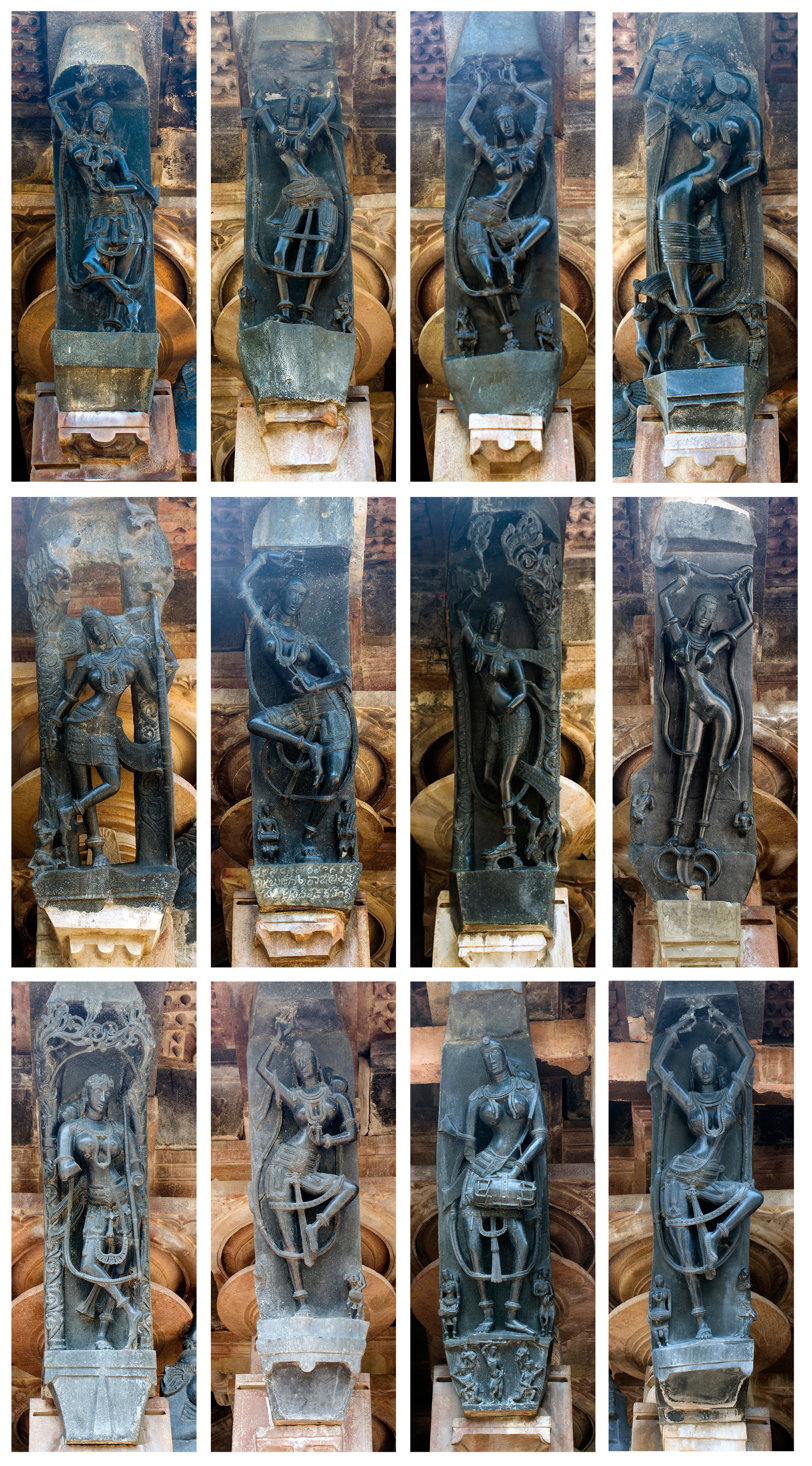
A 13th-century Kakatiya bracket figure from the Ramappa Temple, illustrating the classical dance postures historically associated with temple arts in the region.

According to community traditions and historical records, the origins of the Bogam are synchronous with the building of the great temples during the reigns of the Andhra, Chola, Kakatiya, and Warangal dynasties. Within the temple ecosystem, their assigned duties included fanning the idols with chamras (Tibetan oxtails), carrying the sacred light (Kumbharti), and performing dances and songs when deities were carried in procession.

Historically, the community traced its mythological descent to the Apsaras (celestial dancers) of Indra's court, such as Rambha, Urvashi, Menaka, and Tilottama. During the colonial era, the Bogams were recruited through admission, purchase, or the dedication of young girls to temples in pursuance of vows made during times of affliction. As political power shifted in the Deccan, particularly during the Qutb Shahi dynasty and the subsequent Asaf Jahi dynasty (Nizams of Hyderabad), the community's sphere of influence expanded from exclusively sacred spaces into the secular courts of the Nizams and the private estates of wealthy regional Zamindars.

== Internal structure ==
Colonial-era ethnography, notably Syed Siraj ul Hassan's 1920 survey of the Nizam's Dominions, documented that the community was divided into two main classes: Hindu Bogams and Muhammadan Bogams.

== Customs and practices ==
=== Marriage and religion ===
Historically, girls dedicated to the profession underwent a marriage ceremony before attaining puberty. Hindu girls were typically wedded to idols of Shri Krishna, while Muhammadan girls were married to a khanjir (dagger). Because they were married to immortal deities, Bogam women were culturally regarded by other castes as never entering widowhood.

=== Inheritance ===
Unlike the strictly patriarchal systems of surrounding agrarian castes, property among the dancing girls historically descended through the female line. In the absence of a biological daughter, a dancing girl could adopt a daughter for the transmission of property. Sons could only claim maintenance and marriage expenses.

=== Occupation and arts ===
The Bogams were highly trained professional dancers and musicians. Training in Abhinaya (graceful attitudes and gestures) commenced at a young age. Dancers were accompanied by musicians playing the tabla (drums), sarangis (fiddles), and cymbals. Over time, the community developed a hybrid performative repertoire that heavily integrated regional Telugu folk traditions and courtly poetry.

== Modern transition and social reform ==
=== Anti-Nautch movement and criminalization ===
In the late nineteenth and twentieth centuries, the community faced heavy scrutiny from Christian missionaries and indigenous social reformers during the "Anti-Nautch" movement. Legislation, particularly the 1947 Madras Devadasis (Prevention of Dedication) Act and its subsequent 1956 Andhra Pradesh amendment, criminalized the dedication of women to temples and banned their traditional public performances. Stripped of their temple duties and tax-free lands (mānyālu), many in the community faced severe economic disenfranchisement and social stigma.

=== Identity reclamation and Andhra Natyam ===
In response to the growing social stigma surrounding the term "Bogam", many community members consciously adopted the title Kalavantulu (meaning "receptacles of the arts") to emphasize their intellectual and artistic heritage.

Simultaneously, the traditional dance repertoire of the Kalavantulu was heavily sanitized and reconstructed in the 1970s by scholars such as Nataraja Ramakrishna into the modern classical dance form known as Andhra Natyam. While the art form survived, it was largely appropriated by mainstream, upper-caste performers, leaving the original Kalavantulu descendants detached from their own performative heritage.

=== Present-day status ===
Today, descendants of the community have largely assimilated into mainstream regional demographics. The matrilineal property laws described in colonial texts have been entirely replaced by modern inheritance laws. To support their socio-economic transition, the community is currently recognized under the state-sponsored Backward Class (BC) reservation categories in both Telangana and Andhra Pradesh, often listed officially under terms such as Bogam, Kalavanthulu and other terms.
