= Rādhikā-sāntvanam =

Poem

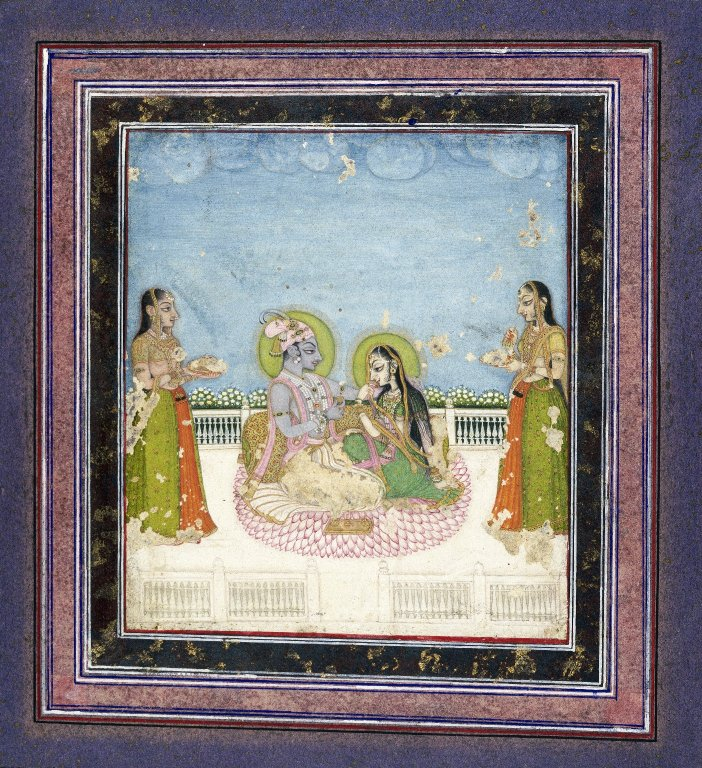
Brooklyn Museum - Krishna and Radha Seated on a Terrace

The Rādhikā-sāntvanam ('Appeasing Radhka') is a poem composed by the Telugu-language poet and devadasi Muddupalani (1739–90) concerning the marital relationship of the deity Krishna, his new wife Ila, and her aunt Radha and the appeasement of the jealousy of Radha.

== Date ==
According to Dru Bhattacharya,

The precise date of composition is unknown, but we can infer that Muddupalani was at least a young woman when she wrote the work (e.g. 18-24 years of age or circa 1757-1763) and that it was crafted while Maharaja Singh was still presiding over the royal court (ie. 1730-63), we can reasonably assume that the work was mostly likely written sometime between 1757 and 1763.

== Content ==
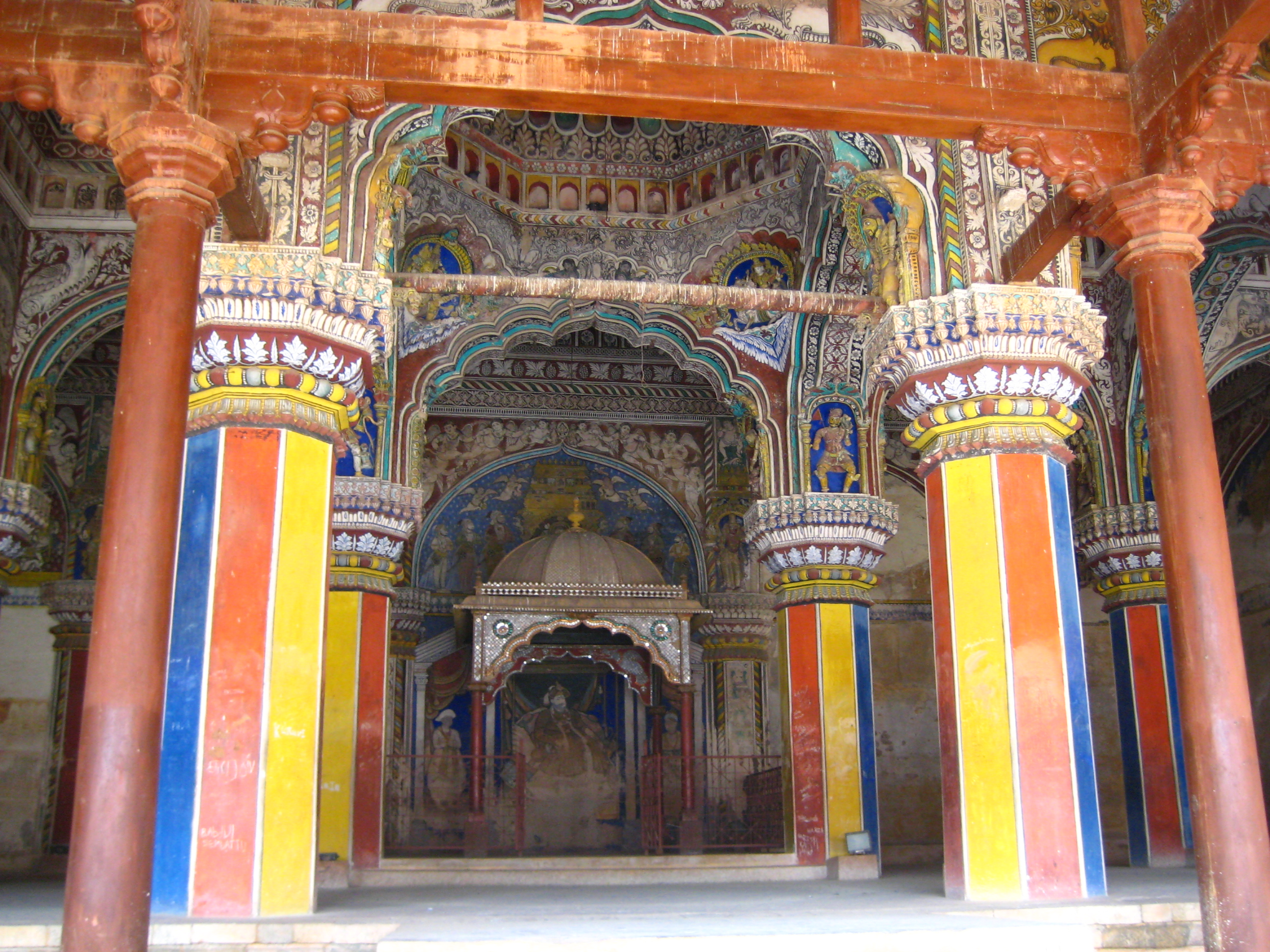
Tanjore Royal Palace

The work comprises four sections, between them consisting of five hundred and eighty-four poems, and belonged to the genre of śṛṅgāra-kāvya or śṛṅgāra-prabandham, 'a genre associated in the history of Telugu literature with the Thanjavur era' whose poems were mostly inventive retellings of the story of Radha and Krishna, evoking the rāsa of Sringara. It was probably influenced by the padams composed by the seventeenth-century poet Kṣetrayya and may have been influenced by the seventeenth-century Satyabhāma Sāntvanamu ('Appeasing Satyabhāmā') by Liṅganamakhi Śrīkāmeśvara Kavi.

The poetry is detailed like an erotic manual where Radha teaches Krishna's new wife Ila how to sexually satisfy him.

The poem is framed as a dialogue between two legendary wise men: Vyasa's son Maharishi Suka (or Suka Muni) and the philosopher-king Janaka.

It tells the tale of Radha, Krishna's aunt, a woman in her prime who brings up Ila Devi from childhood and then gives her in marriage to Krishna. The poem describes in detail Ila Devi's puberty and the consummation of her marriage to Krishna. Radha advises the young bride on how she should respond to Krishna's lovemaking, and Krishna on handling his young bride tenderly. But the poem also captures at the same time the pain of a woman in her prime who must give up her own desire and yearning. At one point, unable to bear the grief of her own separation from Krishna, whom she desires herself, Radha breaks down and rages against Krishna for having abandoned her. Krishna gently appeases her and she is comforted by his loving embrace. It is from this section that the poem takes its title.

The poem is unique in Telugu literature for portraying a woman (Radha) taking in initiative in trying to have sex with a man. This passage, spoken by Krishna, provides a convenient example of the poem's style and content:

If I ask her not to kiss me,

stroking on my cheeks
she presses my lips hard against hers.

If I ask her not to touch me,

stabbing me with her firm breasts
she hugs me.

If I ask her not to get too close
for it is not decorous,

she swears at me loudly.

If I tell her of my vow not
to have a woman in my bed,

she hops on
and begins the game of love.

Appreciative,
she lets me drink from her lips,
fondles me, talks on,
making love again and again.

How could I stay away
from her company?

== Reception ==
The work was at the time 'considered a gem of Telugu literature', but never gained wider attention beyond Andhra Pradesh. However, it was later the subject of controversy. The Rādhikā-sāntvanam was first edited for print publication by Charles Phillip Brown, and annotated, bowdlerised, and seen through the presses by Paidipati Venkatanarasu in 1887, with a second edition in 1907. It was then re-edited in 1910 by the courtesan Bangalore Nagarathnamma to include the full text. In 1911 the British colonial authorities banned this and eight other titles by the same publisher (albeit without great success); the order was not rescinded until 1947.

== Editions and translations ==
- Muddupalani (1910). Radhika Santwanam. Ed. Bangalore Nagaratnamma. Madras: Vavilla Ramaswami Sastrulu and Sons. (reprinted 1952)
- Muddupalani (1972). Radhikasantvanam. Madras: EMESCO Books.
- Muddupalani. (2011). Radhika Santwanam—The Appeasement of Radhika. Trans. Sandhya Mulchandani. New Delhi: Penguin.
