= Davesh Soneji =

Davesh Soneji is a social historian working in the field of performing arts, addressing issues of gender, class, and caste especially in the colonial context. He teaches in the Department of South Asia Studies at the University of Pennsylvania. His work focuses on religion and the performing arts in South India His best known work is Unfinished Gestures: Devadāsīs, Memory, and Modernity in South India; it was awarded the 2013 Bernard S. Cohn Book Prize from The Association for Asian Studies (AAS).

Soneji has held positions as visiting professor at the Central University of Hyderabad in India and Le Centre d'Études de l'Inde et de l'Asie du Sud (CEIAS) in Paris. He has previously taught at McGill University in Montreal, Canada for over twelve years.

== Bibliography ==
- Unfinished Gestures: Devadasis, Memory, and Modernity in South India (2011) University of Chicago Press. ISBN 9780226768113
- Bharatanatyam: A Reader (2012) Oxford University Press. ISBN 9780198083771
- Performing Pasts: Reinventing the Arts in Modern South India (Ed with Indira Viswanathan Peterson) (2008) Oxford University Press. ISBN 9780195690842
