= Ganatantra =

Ganatantra ("Democracy") was an Odia-language newspaper published in Odisha, India between 1956 and 1961. Initially Ganatantra was published from Bolangir, later moving to Cuttack. It started as a weekly newspaper, later converted into a daily. Surendra Mohanty was the editor of the newspaper. Ganatantra was published by Rajendra Narayan Singhdeo, the maharaja of Bolangir, and was politically aligned with the Ganatantra Parishad party.
