= Sasimani Debi =

Last Devdasi of Jagannath Temple

- Born: c. 1923
- Died: 19 March 2015 (92 years); Dolamandap Sahi, Puri, Odisha
- Occupations: Devdasi, Dancer

Sasimani Debi (Note: alternatively spelt as Sashimani, Shashimani, Devi) (c. 1923 – 19 March 2015), was the last living Mahari or Devadasi of the Jagannath Temple of Puri and “human consort” of the Lord Jagannath. Sashimani came from a poor family and was initiated into service at the temple when she was a small girl. At the age of 12, she was considered a “living wife” of Lord Jagannath, and she was not expected to marry anyone in her entire lifespan. According to temple records, she was one of about 25 women assigned to care for Jagannath.

== Early life ==
At the age of 12, Sashimani was inducted into Devadasi Seva after being ceremonially married to Lord Jagannath at the age of 7 or 8. As a part of her duties, she used to dance before the Lord during Badasinghara Besha and festivals related to the Jagannath temple including the Chandan Jatra. As Sashimani grew old, her services were confined to reciting the Gitagovinda in the traditional Odissi music manner.

== Devadasi culture in Odisha ==
The Orissa Gazette of 1956 mentions some occasions where the devadasis danced. They had two daily rituals. The Bahar Gaunis would dance at the Sakaala Dhupa. Lord Jagannath, after breakfast, would give Darshan to the bhaktas (the devotees). In the main hall, a Devadasi accompanied by musicians and the Rajguru, the court guru, would dance, standing near the Garuda Sthambha (pillar).This dance could be watched by the audience. They would perform only pure dance here. The Bhitar Gaunis would sing at the Badasinghara, the main ceremony for ornamenting and dressing the God. Lord Jagannath, at bedtime, would be first served by male Sebaets- they would fan Him and decorate Him with flowers.

== Death ==
At the age of 92 she died at Dolamandapa Sahi, Puri, and was cremated at Swargadwar in Puri, where her foster son Somanath Panda lit the funeral pyre brought from the kitchen of the Jagannath temple.
