= Oriental Research Institute & Manuscripts Library =

Research collection at University of Kerala

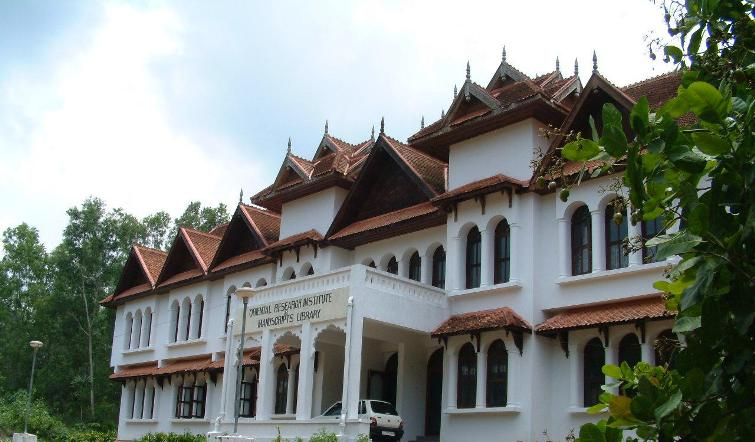
Oriental Research Institute

Oriental Research Institute & Manuscripts Library (ORIMSS) is an academic department of the University of Kerala dedicated for Indology. It is located at Kariavattom, Thiruvananthapuram, Kerala. The institute carry out researches on Indian manuscripts, about 80% of which are in Sanskrit. The department is microfilming the manuscripts of certain technical subjects.

== History ==
The genesis of this library is to be traced to the orders of Ayilyam Thirunal, Maharaja of Travancore to collect all manuscripts in the state so as to be kept in the safe custody of the Palace Library. Considering the overwhelming enthusiasm from the Orientalists all over the world, during early nineteen hundred Swathi Thirunal Maharaja (the then King of Travancore) published many of the manuscripts in the Palace Library and the manuscripts collection of ancient families.

The Oriental Research Institute & Manuscripts Library has over 70,000 works in 30,000 copies mainly of palm leaf manuscripts. In addition, some paper manuscripts, a few copper plates, writings on Bhurjapatra (birch bark), Agarutvak (the bark of Aquilaria malaccensis) and textiles are also found in the collection. The manuscript collection also includes those belonging to other different Indian states and nations such as Burma, Malaysia, Indonesia, Nepal etc. Another interesting fact is that about eighty per cent of the collections are in Sanskrit. The manuscript collection of this department is an invaluable source for the study of ancient scripts as Grantha, Vattezhuttu, Sarada, Nandinagari, Grantha Tamil etc. The initial moulds of scripts of modern Indian languages like Bengali, Marathi, Gujarati, Kannada, Telugu, Odia, Assamese and Burmese are also found.

=== Curators of the library ===
In 1908 T. Ganapati Sastri became the curator of this library. Sambasiva Sastri succeeded Ganapati Sastri as the curator of this library. He wrote Citrabhyudaya Kavya about Travancore king.
