= Madras Devadasis (Prevention of Dedication) Act, 1947 =

Madras Legislative Council
- Territorial extent: South India
- Enacted by: Madras Presidency
- Enacted: 9 October 1947

Legislative history
- Bill title: Devadasi Abolition Bill
- Introduced by: O. P. Ramaswamy Reddiyar, Muthulakshmi Reddi

Related legislation
- 1956 Madras Anti-Devadasi Act

Summary
- Gave devadasis the legal right to marry and made it illegal to dedicate girls to Hindu temples

Keywords
- Devadasi, prostitution in India
- Status: In force

The Madras Devadasis (Prevention of Dedication) Act, 1947 (also called the Tamil Nadu Devadasis (Prevention of Dedication) Act, 1947 or the Madras Devadasi Act, 1947) is a law that was enacted on 9 October 1947 just after India became independent from British rule. The law was passed in the Madras Presidency and gave devadasis the legal right to marry and made it illegal to dedicate girls to Hindu temples. The bill that became this act was the Devadasi Abolition Bill.

Periyar E. V. Ramasamy was part of the efforts in passing the Devadasi Abolition Bill but, owing to strong protests from devadasis across Madras Presidency, he suggested that the bill be introduced only as a private member's bill and not as a public bill.

Muthulakshmi Reddi proposed the bill to the Madras Legislative Council as early as 1930 but was passed on only during the Premiership of O. P. Ramaswamy Reddiyar (a.k.a. Omandur Reddy's Congress led government) on 9 October 1947.

Some devadasis objected to the bill because they considered themselves sophisticated and learned artists rather than prostitutes. The Madras Devadasi Act was not as strict as subsequent related laws. Because the Madras Devadasi Act was specific to devadasis, prostitution continued in South India, particularly along the coast in Andhra Pradesh, until the Madras Anti-Devadasi Act was passed on 14 August 1956. The Madras Devadasi Act is one of several laws passed in the presidencies and provinces of British India and the subsequent states and territories of India that made prostitution illegal, including the 1934 Bombay Devadasi Protection Act, the 1957 Bombay Protection (Extension) Act, and the 1988 Andhra Pradesh Devadasi (Prohibition of Dedication) Act.
