= Muthulakshmi Reddy =

Indian physician and legislator

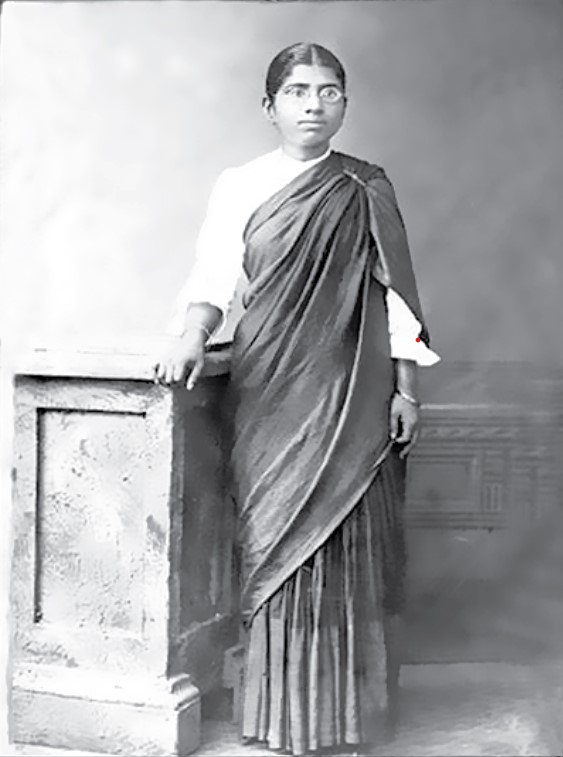
- Muthulakshmi Reddy, c. 1912
- Born: 30 July 1886; Thirukokarnam, Pudukkottai State, India (now in Pudukkottai District, Tamil Nadu, India)
- Died: 22 July 1968 (aged 81); Madras, Madras State (now Chennai, Tamil Nadu), India
- Known for: Social Reformer, Women's Rights Activism and Writing
- Spouse: Sundara Reddy
- Children: S. Krishnamurthi; S. Rammohan
- Relatives: Gemini Ganesan (nephew)
- Awards: Padma Bhushan (1956)

Muthulakshmi Reddy (also spelled Reddi in some British Indian sources; 30 July 1886 – 22 July 1968) was an Indian medical practitioner, social reformer and Padma Bhushan award recipient.

Muthulakshmi Reddy was appointed to the Madras Legislative Council in 1926. This nomination marked the beginning of her lifelong effort to "correct the balance for women by removing social abuses and working for equality in moral standards″. She was a women's activist and social reformer.

She had a number of firsts to her name: the first female student to be admitted into a men's college, the first woman House Surgeon in the Government Maternity and Ophthalmic Hospital, the first woman Legislator in British India, the first Chairperson of the State Social Welfare Advisory Board, the first woman Deputy President of the Legislative Council, and the first woman in the Madras Corporation. She built Avvai Home in 1931.

Reddy was born in the princely state of Pudukkottai of Tamil Nadu. In spite of various constraints faced by girls in India of her time, she completed her higher education and was admitted into the medical profession. In 1907, she joined the Madras Medical College, where she achieved a brilliant academic record. With several gold medals and prizes to her credit, Reddy graduated in 1912 to become one of the first female doctors in India. Soon after, she came under the influence of Annie Besant, and then of Mahatma Gandhi.

Her name was included in the first national flag hoisted on Red Fort in 1947.

== Personal life ==
Her father was S. Narayanaswami Iyer, the Principal of Maharaja's College. Her mother Chandrammal, a Devadasi, was only 11 years old when she implored Narayanaswami, a 30-year-old man who was to become her patron after her Devadasi dedication ceremony, to take her away from the life of a public woman. Narayanaswami was ostracised from his family because of his marriage to a Devadasi. Muthulakshmi's unique family background influenced her life's work. She developed a close relationship with the maternal side of her family, and this closeness made her very perceptive of the Devadasi community and their issues. Narayanaswami Iyer broke the tradition and sent Muthulakshmi to school. Her enthusiasm for learning was so great that Muthulakshmi's teachers decided to instruct her in subjects beyond those approved by her father. At the onset of puberty, she was obliged to leave school, but tutoring continued at home. Chandrammal wanted to search for a bridegroom but Muthulakshmi had different aspirations. She expressed a need to be different from the common lot. She was against the subordination of women to men and rebelled whenever she heard people say that only boys needed education.

When Reddy passed the Matriculation exam she applied for admission to Maharaja's College but her application was not welcomed by the Principal or the parents of other students. Her gender was a factor as was her background. The Principal thought she might "demoralize" the male students. The somewhat enlightened Maharaja of Pudukottai ignored these objections, admitted her to the college, and gave her a scholarship. Due to protests, the condition for her admission was that for three months she would be observed to check if her character remains "blemishless." In the classroom a big screen was put in the middle to separate her from the boys, and the bell would ring only after she left the college, only then could the boys leave. She graduated with flying colours and her father suggested that she can become a school teacher but she had higher aspirations. She entered Madras Medical College in 1907 as the first woman to be admitted there, she received a scholarship of 150 rupees from the maharaja, completed her studies in 1912 with seven gold medals, and became House Surgeon in the Government Hospital for Women and Children in Madras(current day Chennai). While she was in Madras, she came to know that her cousin had died giving birth to a child and the father of the child had no responsibility to look after the infant due to the Devadasi system of those times. Muthulakshmi looked after this child while she was still a medical student. Even in that time she managed to volunteer in girls homes, study Indian history, listen to lectures of Theosophical Society, meet personalities like Annie Besant and Sarojini Naidu and began to write in a magazine called India and give Tamil translation to English essays.

She later married Sundara Reddy with the proviso that he "always respect me as an equal and never cross my wishes." In 1914, when she was twenty-eight years of age, they married in accordance with the 1872 Native Marriage Act. After marriage, Muthulakshmi took her husband's surname Reddy. Popular Tamil actor Gemini Ganesan is the son of Muthulakshmi's brother Ramasamy.

== Influences ==
During her college years Muthulakshmi met Sarojini Naidu and began to attend women's meetings. She found women who shared her concerns and addressed them in terms of women's rights. The two great personalities who influenced her life were Mahatma Gandhi and Annie Besant. They persuaded her to devote herself to uplifting women and children. Mahatma Gandhi had invited her to participate in the freedom struggle, but she refused because she wanted to devote her whole time to the welfare of women and children. But she supported the participation of women in Civil Disobedience Movement of 1930, and she resigned as legislator protesting against the arrest of Mahatma Gandhi. She worked for women's emancipation at a time when women were confined in the four walls of their room.

== Activism ==
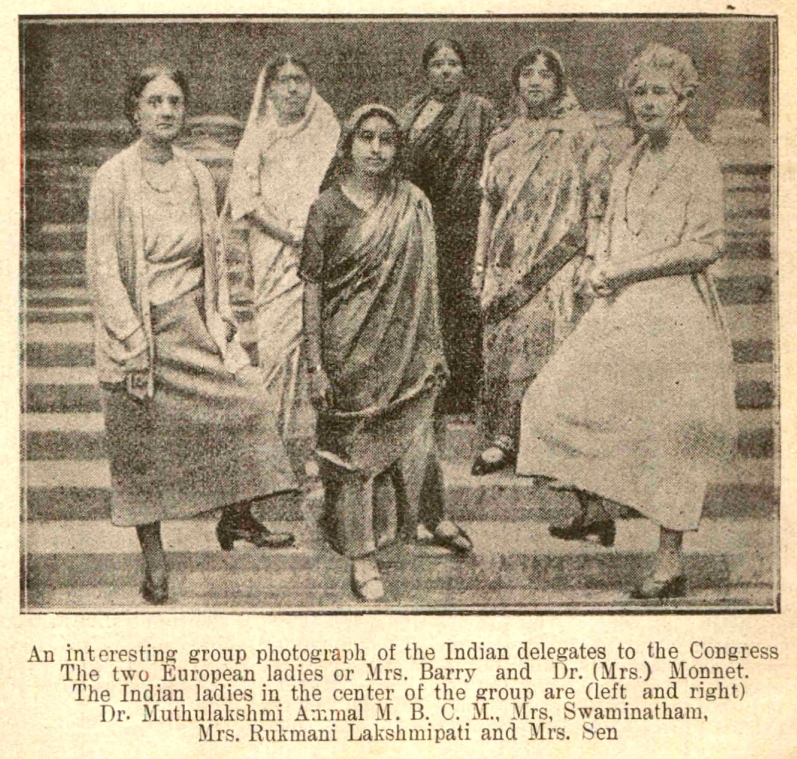
Dr Muthulakshmi at the Paris Women's Congress, 1926

She went to England for higher studies and she gave up her rewarding practice in medicine in response to a request from the Women's Indian Association (WIA) to enter the Madras Legislative Council. She was elected unanimously as its deputy president. She led the agitation for the municipal and legislative franchise for women. She was concerned about the orphans, especially girls. She arranged for them free board and lodging and started the Avvai Home in Chennai.

Muthu Lakshmi was the author of numerous social reforms. Her book My Experience as a Legislator records her service. She passed a resolution to establish a special hospital for women and children. The government accepted her suggestion and opened a children's section in the maternity hospital. She recommended systematic medical inspection of students in all schools and colleges, run by municipalities as well as other local bodies. Kasturba Hospital at Triplicane is a monument to her efforts.

She was the president of the All-India Women's Conference. She passed the bill for the suppression of brothels and the immoral trafficking of women and children. A home called Avvai Home for girls and women was opened through her efforts to provide shelter to those rescued from brothels.

"The hostels were all caste-based and would not admit them. Neither would schools. It was then that she decided to house them and educate them herself. Thus was born 'Avvai Illam' (Avvai's Home) for the poor and destitute girls."

Due to her efforts, a hostel for Muslim girls was opened and scholarships were given to Harijan girls. She recommended to the government that the minimum age for marriage be raised to at least 21 for boys and 16 for girls.

Muthu Lakshmi also started the Cancer Relief Fund. This has now developed into an all-India institution combining therapy and research on cancer and attracting patients from all over India. She became the first chairperson of the State Social Welfare Board. Her work on the Hartog Education Committee, which incorporated a study of educational progress in India, is a great achievement. As a member of this committee, she traveled extensively and studied the progress of women's education throughout the country. She was the only female member of the committee and brought about many improvements. She was also the editor of Roshini, an important journal of AIWC.

She continued to fight for her cause until the end of her days. Even at the age of 80, she was energetic and vibrant. Her human preoccupations took her away from politics and she stuck to her mission and Gandhian ways. She was awarded the Padma Bhushan by the President of India in 1956. Her two outstanding monumental gifts for India remain the Avvai Home (for children) and the Cancer Institute.

== Political career ==
Mahatma Gandhi had invited her to participate in the freedom struggle, but she refused because she wanted to devote her whole time to the welfare of women and children, out of jail, within the government system. She was a legislator in Madras where she moved the Bill in 1926 to abolish Devadasi system. She also worked as the elected deputy chairman of the assembly, the first example of a woman in that position in the whole world. She supported the participation of women in Civil Disobedience Movement of 1930, and she resigned as legislator protesting against the arrest of Mahatma Gandhi.

== Legacy in Healthcare ==
=== Adyar Cancer Institute ===
She had seen her younger sister die of Cancer, and the radiation treatment was far away in Kolkata or Ranchi. During her address at the Centenary celebration of 1935, she declared her desire to start a hospital for cancer patients. She didn't succeed at first but later she founded the institute with her great efforts. The foundation stone for Adyar Cancer Institute was laid by prime minister Jawaharlal Nehru in 1952. The hospital, which started functioning on 18 June 1954, was the second of its kind in India. Today it treats nearly 80,000 cancer patients a year.

== Services to the Tamil Language and people ==
She worked for the Tamil music movement, Tamil Language development and she protested to increase the salary of Tamil teachers and writers. She was the editor of the monthly magazine 'Sthree Dharumam' for women run by the Indian Women Association.

== Awards and books ==
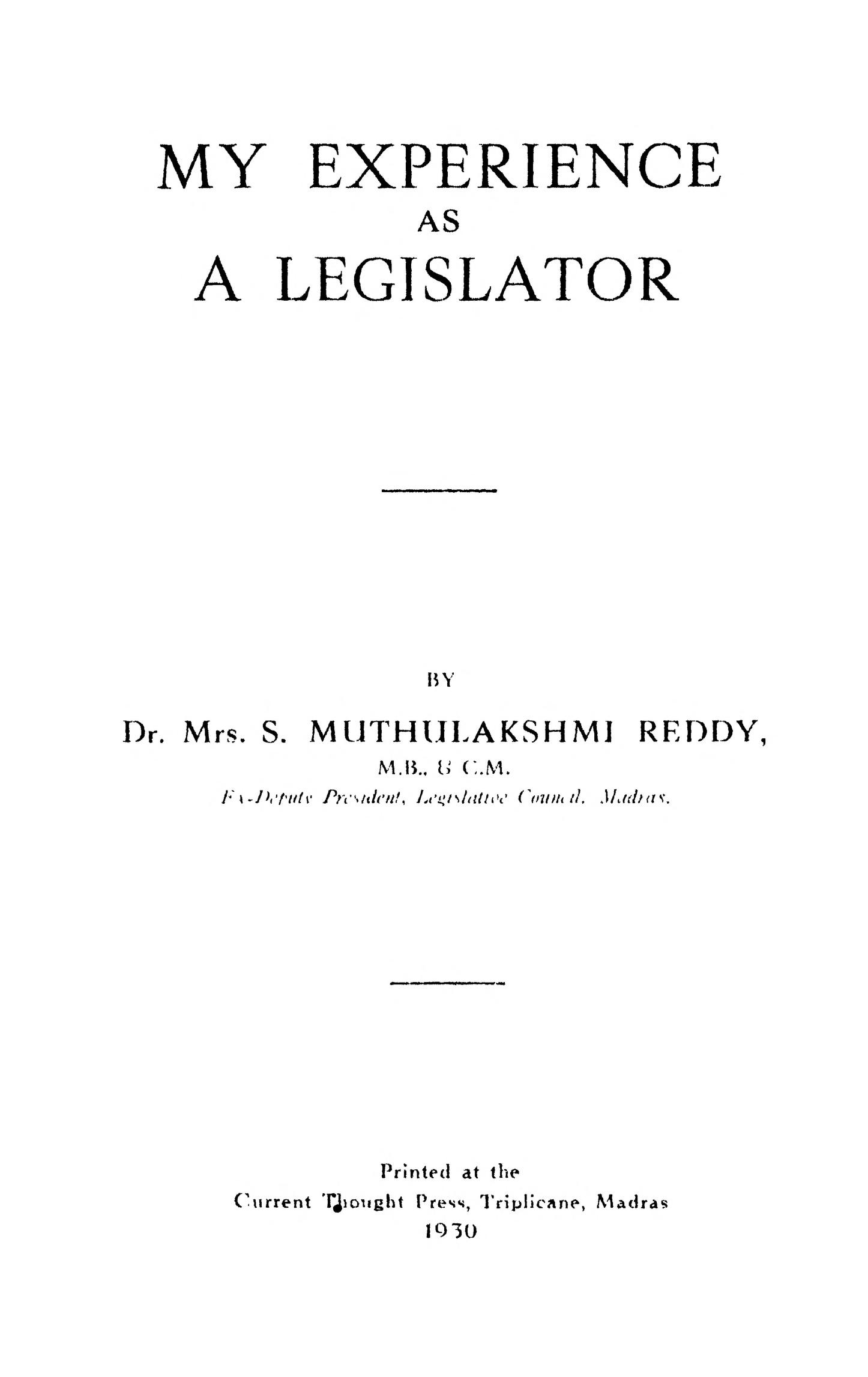
Title page of My Experiences as a Legislator (1930)

Her book My Experience as a Legislator recounts her initiatives in respect of social reforms taken by her in the Madras Legislature. Government of India conferred on her Padma Bhushan in 1956 in recognition of her meritorious services to the nation.

Reddi inspired an award that is given to women who have given service in cancer prevention.

== Tribute ==
On 30 July 2019, Google showed a Doodle celebrating what would have been her 133rd birthday.

In 2022 a monograph was published, Muthulakshmi Reddy—A Trailblazer in Surgery and Women’s Rights written by VR Devika, emphasizing the contributions of this legendary medical practitioner, social reformer, and feminist to the development of Indian women.

== See also ==
- Kadambini Ganguly
- Guruswami Mudaliar
- Abala Bose
- Anandi Gopal Joshi
- Rukmini Devi Arundale
- Subhas Chandra Bose
