= Viralimalai Subramanya Swamy Temple =

Subramanya Swamy Temple Viralimalai
- Viralimalai Shanmuganathar Koil
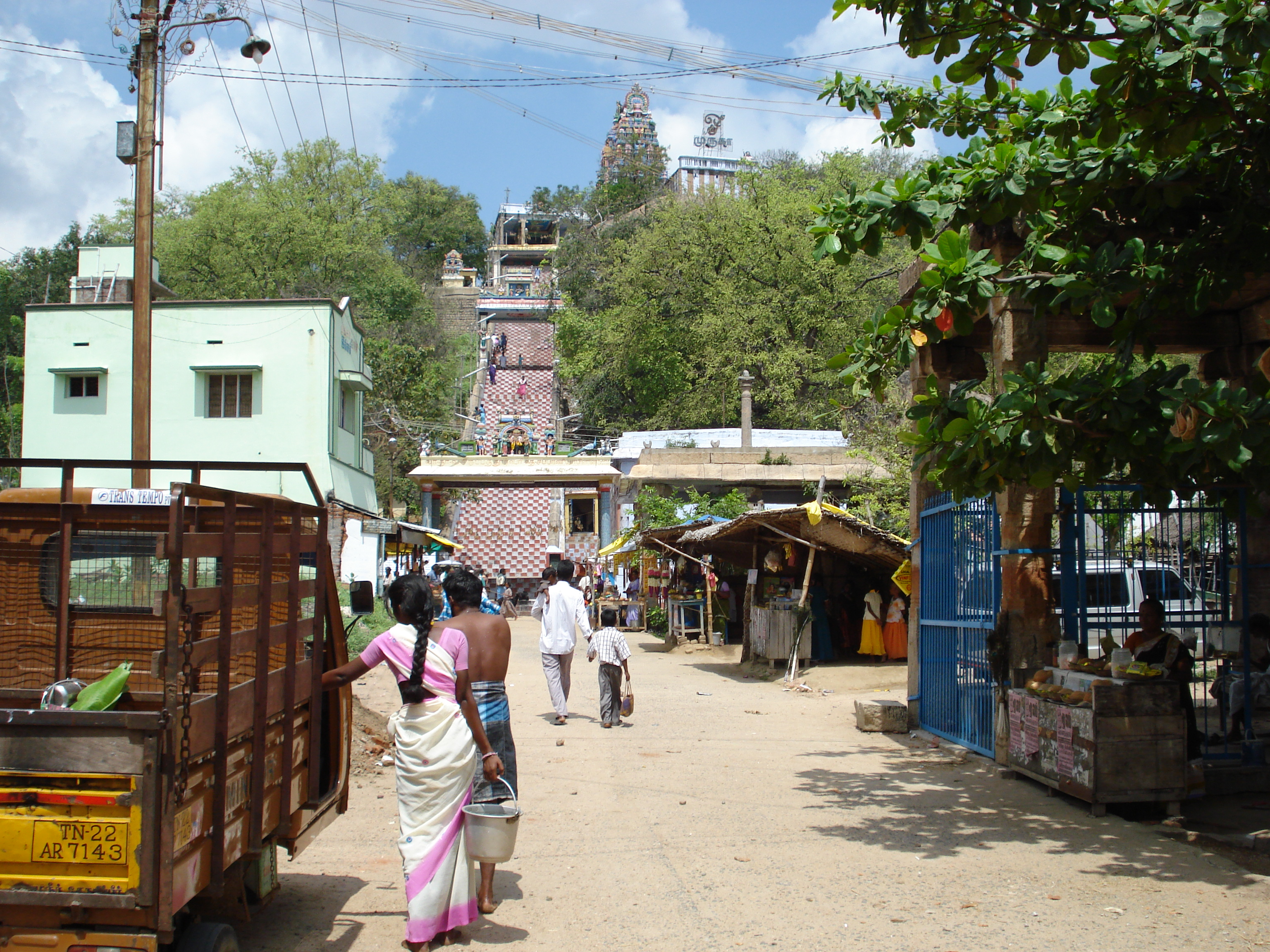

Religion
- Affiliation: Hinduism
- District: Pudukkottai
- Deity: Shanmuganathar, Murugan

Location
- Location: Viralimalai
- State: Tamil Nadu
- Country: India

Architecture
- Type: South Indian, Kovil

Viralimalai Subramanya Swamy Temple is one of the Hindu temples dedicated to Lord Muruga, located in the town of Viralimalai about 28 km from Trichy, 40 km from Pudukottai and 15 km from Manapparai in Tamil Nadu, India.

== Religious importance ==
Arunagirinathar was a 15th-century Tamil poet born in Tiruvannamalai. He spent his early years as a rioter and seducer of women. After ruining his health, he tried to commit suicide by throwing himself from the northern tower of Annamalaiyar Temple, but was saved by the grace of god Murugan. He became a staunch devotee and composed Tamil hymns glorifying Murugan, the most notable being Thirupugazh. Arunagirinathar visited various Murugan temples and on his way back to Tiruvannamalai, visited Viralimalai and sung praises about Murugan.
