= Cancer Institute (WIA) =

Cancer hospital in India

Cancer Institute (WIA - Women's Indian Association)
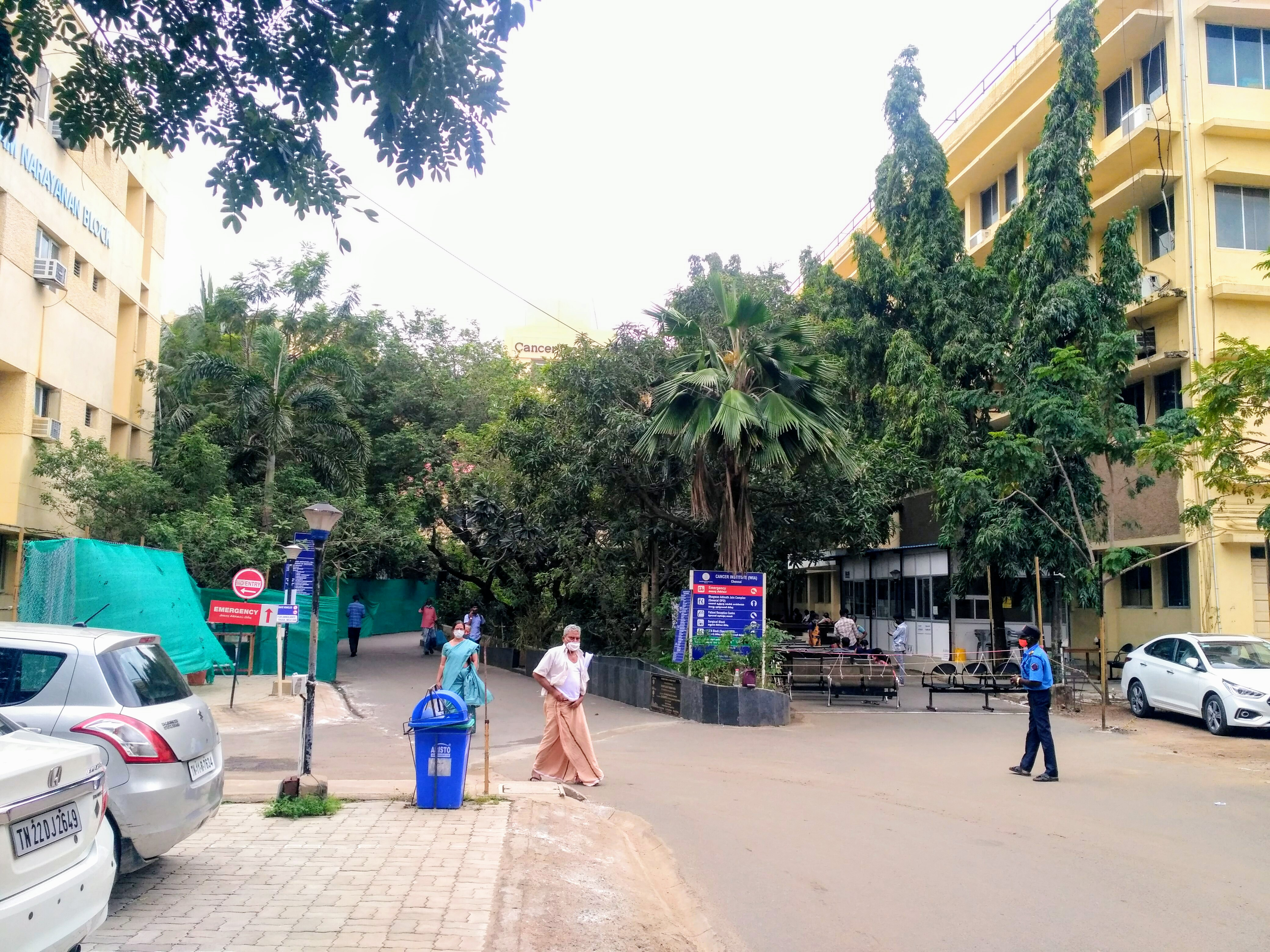
- Other name: Adyar Cancer Institute
- Motto: Service to All
- Founder: Muthulakshmi Reddy
- Established: 1954; 72 years ago
- Focus: Cancer research Oncology
- Chairman: R. Seshasayee
- Location: Adyar, Chennai, India
- Website: Official website

The Cancer Institute (WIA - Women's Indian Association), also known as the Adyar Cancer Institute, is a non-profit cancer treatment and research centre based in Chennai, Tamil Nadu. The Cancer Institute (WIA) was established in the year 1952 under the leadership of Muthulakshmi Reddy. In 1974, the institute became the Regional Cancer Centre and declared a "Centre of Excellence" by the Ministry of Health and Family Welfare.

== Academics ==
Cancer Institute (WIA) is the first medical school in India to offer degrees in various sub-specialities of oncology recognized by the Medical Council of India. The institute has been conducting MD (Radiotherapy), DM (Medical Oncology), MCh (Surgical Oncology) and other Diploma and Fellowship programmes, affiliated to the MGR Medical University. The institute is also recognised by both the University of Madras and Anna University for research leading to MPhil and PhD degrees in the areas of medical physics, psycho-oncology and molecular oncology.

== See also ==
- Healthcare in Chennai
- Healthcare in India
