= Muddupalani =

18th-century Telugu poet and scholar

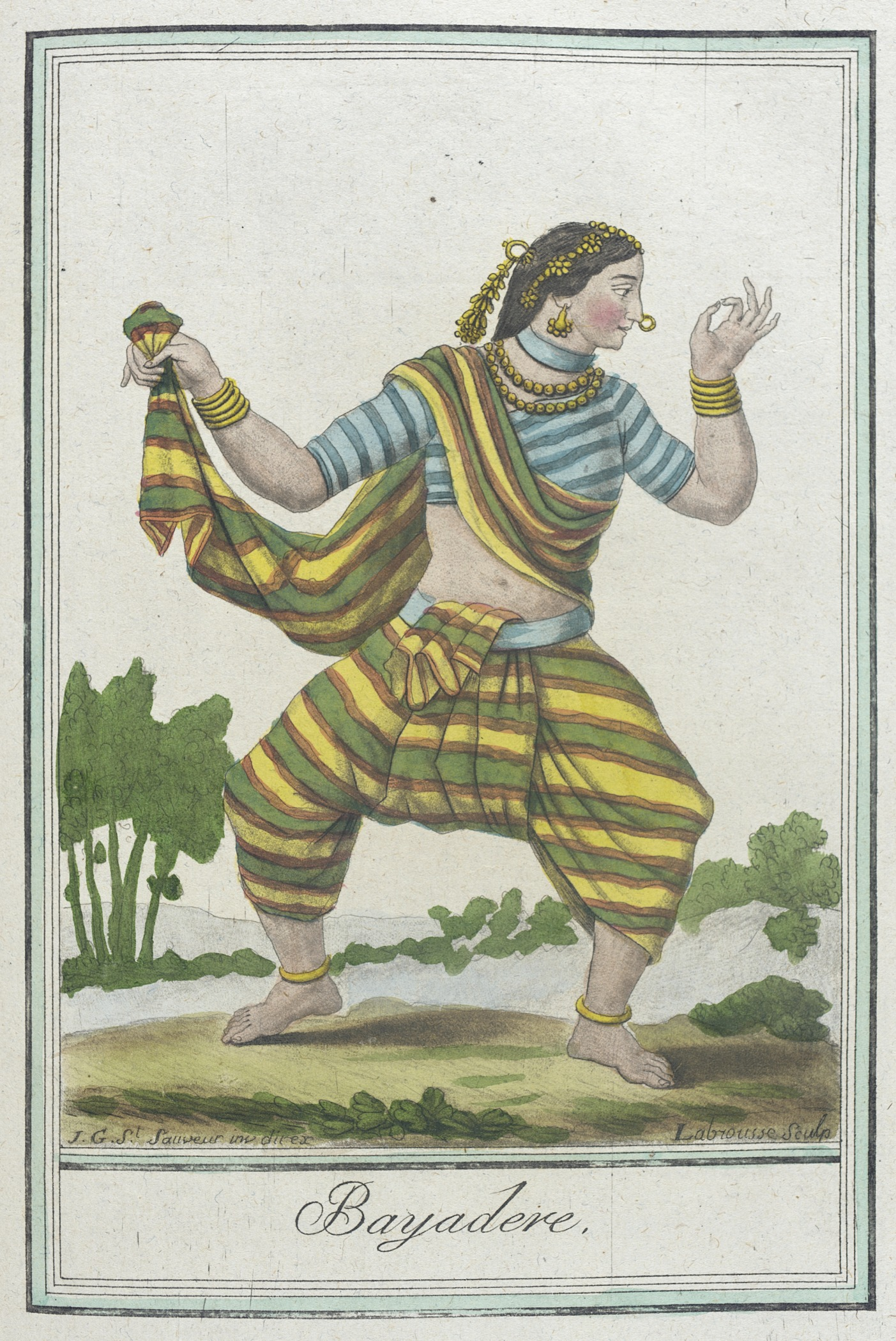
Contemporary depiction of an 18th century Devadasi

Muddupalani (fl. c. 1750) was a Telugu speaking poet and devadasi attached to the court of Pratap Singh (1739–63), the Maratha king of Tanjore. Some commentators date her life to 1739-90, and her place of birth as Nagavasram in Thanjavur district. She is noted as a poet and scholar and particularly for her erotic epic Rādhikā-sāntvanam ("Appeasing Radha").

== Life ==
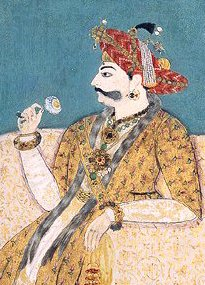
Pratap Singh of Thanjavur

Muddupalani was well versed in Telugu and Sanskrit literature, was an accomplished dancer, and came from a devadasi family:

Muddupalani was the granddaughter of an exceptionally gifted courtesan called Tanjanayaki, who was not only a talented musician but was also adept at the nava rasas. At her soirees, where music and conversation flowed, she entertained learned scholars and aristocrats. But ... she longed to have children. She adopted a boy and a girl, children of Ayyavaya, a man she considered her brother. She raised the young boy, whom she named Muthyalu, to adulthood, and got him married to another talented and beautiful courtesan called Rama Vadhuti. A staunch devotee of Lord Subramanya Swami, Muthyalu named his first-born daughter after the temple town of Palani where stands a famous temple dedicated to the beautiful warrior son of Lord Shiva. Keeping the surname Muddu before the name, a general practice in the south, Muddupalani was thus born into an extremely talented, artistic and devout household.

She became one of the consorts of Pratap Singh, whose court was noted for its patronage of the arts, and whose predecessors included Raghunatha Nayak (r. 1600-34), whose court also played host to numbers of skilled female poets and musicians, such as Ramabhadramba and Madhuravani:

Unlike a family woman in her time, as a courtesan Muddupalani would have had access to learning and the leisure to write and practise the arts. She would have owned property and expected and enjoyed functional equality with men. Obviously, the esteem in which Muddupalani was held and the acclaim her work received can be attributed as much to the contexts, literary and social, she drew upon as to her own talent.

The Rādhikā-sāntvanam seems to reflect Muddupalani's own experiences of sexual and interpersonal relationships:

apparently, her grandmother Tanjanayaki too had been a consort of the king, displaced by Muddupalani. After a few years, when the king renewed his attentions towards the older woman, the young and petulant Muddupalani is said to have become progressively jealous and taciturn, leaving the king no option but to appease her.

Little more is known of Muddupalani's life, beyond what can be gleaned from the Rādhikā-sāntvanam, in which she says

Which other woman of my kind has
felicitated scholars with such gifts and money?
To which other women of my kind have
epics been dedicated?
Which other woman of my kind has
won such acclaim in each of the arts?
You are incomparable,
Muddupalani, among your kind.
[...]
A face that glows like the full moon,
skills of conversation, matching the countenance.
Eyes filled with compassion,
matching the speech.
A great spirit of generosity,
matching the glance.
These are the ornaments
that adorn Palani,
when she is praised by kings.

== Works ==
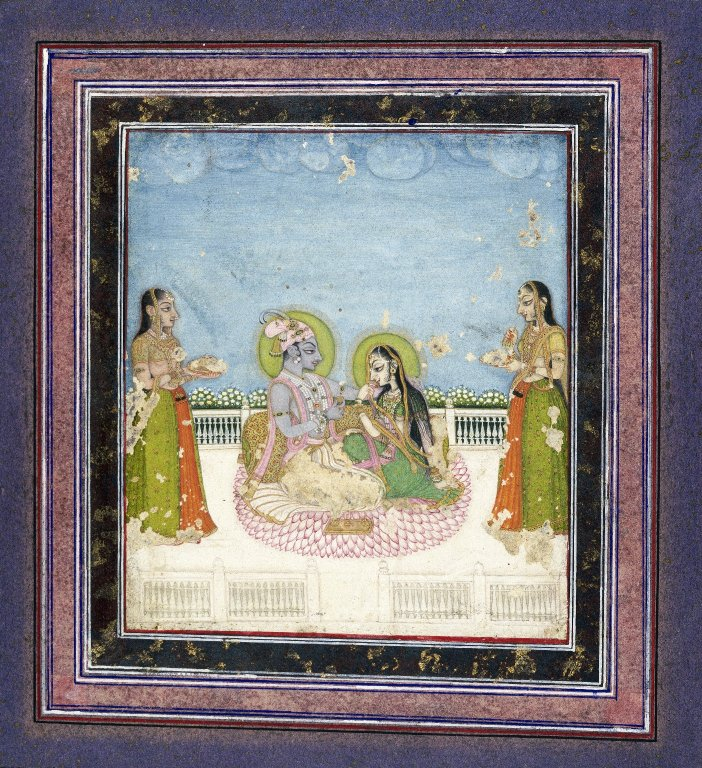
Brooklyn Museum - Krishna and Radha Seated on a Terrace

Her best-known work is Rādhikā-sāntvanam ("Appeasing Radha"), an erotic narrative poem that deals with the marital relationship of the deity Krishna, his female friend Radha and new wife Ila, and the appeasement of the jealousy of Radha. Much later it was added that she received the concept of this poem when Krishna visited her in a dream and suggested that she write about the subject. The poem became the subject of a censorship controversy in the early 20th century, because of its sexual frankness, and especially, because it portrayed its women characters as taking the initiative in sex.

Muddupalani's other well-known work is Ashtapadi, a Telugu translation of Jayadeva's eponymous work. She also translated the Thiruppavai by Andal, and experimented with a form called saptapadalu, seven-lined songs, none of which survive.

Rādhikā-sāntvanam was translated into Tamil by D.Uma Devi from university of Delhi.
