= Viralimalai =

- taluk
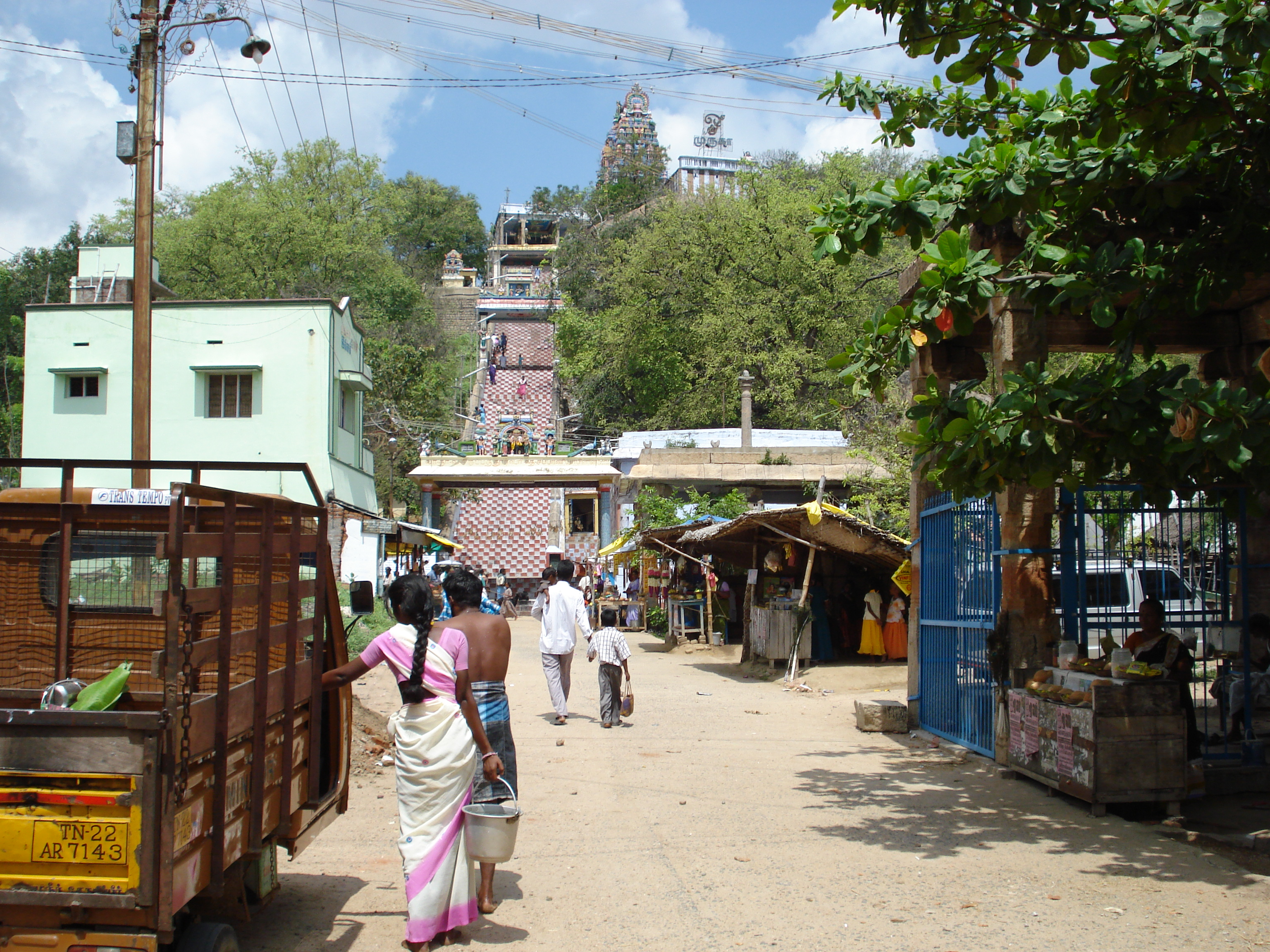
- Viralimalai Murugan Temple

- Location in Tamil Nadu, India
- Coordinates: 10°36′6″N 78°32′47″E
- Country: India
- State: Tamil Nadu
- District: Pudukkottai

Population (2001)
  - Total: 38,866

Languages
  - Official: Tamil
- Time zone: UTC+5:30 (IST)
- PIN: 621316
- Telephone code: 04339
- Vehicle registration: TN-55
- Nearest city: Trichy, Pudukkottai
- Lok Sabha constituency: Karur
- Assembly constituency: Viralimalai

Viralimalai is a developing town and Suburb of city of Tiruchirappalli, located in Pudukkottai District, 28 km from Tiruchirappalli in Tamil Nadu, India. The famous Lord Shanmuganathar temple is situated on the top of the granite hill at Viralimalai. The temple was once a renowned seat of the Bharatanatyam dance form and boasted of a separate dancer for each of the 32 adavus (dance movements).Arunagirinathar vizha(festival) also takes place each year in the Tamil month of aadi.

== History ==
The natural caverns in the hillock show signs of early human habitation and may have shared the fortunes of Kodumbalur, 6 km away. The presence of an early Chola temple suggests that Viralimalai was a prosperous village as early as the 9th century AD. The sides of this hill are covered with non-thorny trees, mainly Wrightia. Viralimalai is home to an exclusive kuravanji dance-drama. The kuravanji named after Viralimalai has had an unbroken tradition of presentation for nearly two centuries. On Maha Shivaratri night every year, till 1993, the Kuravanji was played as an all-night show to large crowds of nobles, officials and ordinary folk, in front of the mandapam below the foot of the hill.

== Peacock Sanctuary ==
Peacocks are abundant in the region and Viralimalai forms a sanctuary for the birds. The town, Temple and Peacock Sanctuary have been declared and funded as a Heritage Place by order of the Governor. Viralimalai tk

== See also ==
- Sathivayal
