= Tara Rajkumar =

Indian classical dancer

- Born: 1948 (age 77–78); Kozhikode, Kerala, India
- Occupations: Dancer, choreographer, Dance teacher
- Known for: Kathakali, Mohiniyattam
- Spouse: Raj Rajkumar
- Parent: TMB Nedungadi
- Awards: Medal of the Order of Australia; Victorian Honour Roll of Women

Tara Rajkumar is an Indian classical dancer and dance teacher. She is an exponent in Indian classical dances like Kathakali and Mohiniyattam. In 2009, she was awarded the Medal of the Order of Australia. She also received many other awards including Victorian Honour Roll of Women and Victorian Volunteer Award.

== Biography ==
Tara was born in Kozhikode, Kerala as the daughter of T. M. B. Nedungadi, former chairman of Kerala Kalamandalam. Tara is the great grand-niece of Appu Nedungadi, the author of Kundalata, the first novel in Malayalam. Attracted to Indian classical dances from a young age, she started learning Kathakali at the age of four. She lived in many places in India during her youth. Although she started learning Kathakali in Bombay, when she was too young, her serious training was from Moleri Namboothiri in Kochi. While in Delhi, she studied Kathakali under Guru Punnathoor Madhava Panicker, at the International Centre for Kathakali (ICK). A disciple of three legends Kalamandalam Krishnan Nair, Kalyanikutty Amma and Mani Madhava Chakyar, Tara started performing classical dance while still in school. While in Delhi, she also received training in Odissi from Guru Surendra Nath Jena.

After her marriage with Dr. Rajkumar, a scientist, they first went to UK and then to Australia. They live in Melbourne now.

== Career ==
In her career, she has performed or taught Indian classical dance in India, United Kingdom, Europe and Australia. She has also performed in famous theatres like London's South Bank, Sydney's Opera House and Melbourne's Victorian Arts Centre.

While in England, she founded Akademi (then called the Academy of Indian Dance), a classical dance center in England which runs to this day (as of 2023). It was with seed funding from the British government, she set up the National Academy of Indian Dance which later renamed as the South Asian Dance Academy, in London, in 1979.

Tara Rajkumar immigrated to Australia in 1983 and established Natya Sudha School and Natya Sudha Dance Company in Melbourne to teach Indian classical dance. She is widely recognised as a key person in popularizing Indian classical arts such as Mohiniyattam and Kathakali in Australia. Her productions have toured Australia, United Kingdom, India, New Zealand and Thailand. With support from Commission for the Future, AsiaLink and Multicultural Arts Victoria, she developed a unique cross-cultural project, Traditions in Transition, which culminated in a season of performances at CUB Malthouse. She was the artistic director of a project that brought together classical and contemporary dance from Japan, China and India, highlighting the contributions of Australian resident artists to the Australian national cultural fabric.

While in Australia, she received a fellowship from Monash University and later became Director of Performing Arts at the Monash Asia Institute.

Tara was the artistic director and principal dancer of the Indian dance component of the Australian Festival of Japan to Venice program held at the Victorian Arts Centre. She developed a course, New Dance Forms and Old Cultures, for undergraduate students at Monash University, the first of its kind in Australia. Through such programs she made classical South Asian dance accessible to the society at large.

Tara's work has been exhibited at the Immigration Museum in Melbourne in recognition of her contribution to society as an immigrant to Australia. She is known as a dancer, choreographer, art director, teacher, researcher and communicator. A documentary on her, Tara the Singing Anklet by Vinod Mankara, premiered at the Indian Film Festival of Melbourne in 2023.

== Notable performances ==
Her work titled Temple Dreaming, based on the life of Louise Lightfoot and her passion for Kathakali, was first performed at the Alexander Theatre at Monash University, Australia and later in many venues in both India and Australia. Tara was the first performer to perform the role Mary Magdalene in Kathakali.

== Awards and honors ==
In 2009, she was awarded the Medal of the Order of Australia. She is also included in the inaugural Victorian Honour Roll of Women for her contribution to Victoria and the country. She also received many other awards including Victorian Volunteer Award in 2006 by Victorian Government and Ethnic Arts Award.
