= Kala Vijayan =

Indian performer (born 1944)

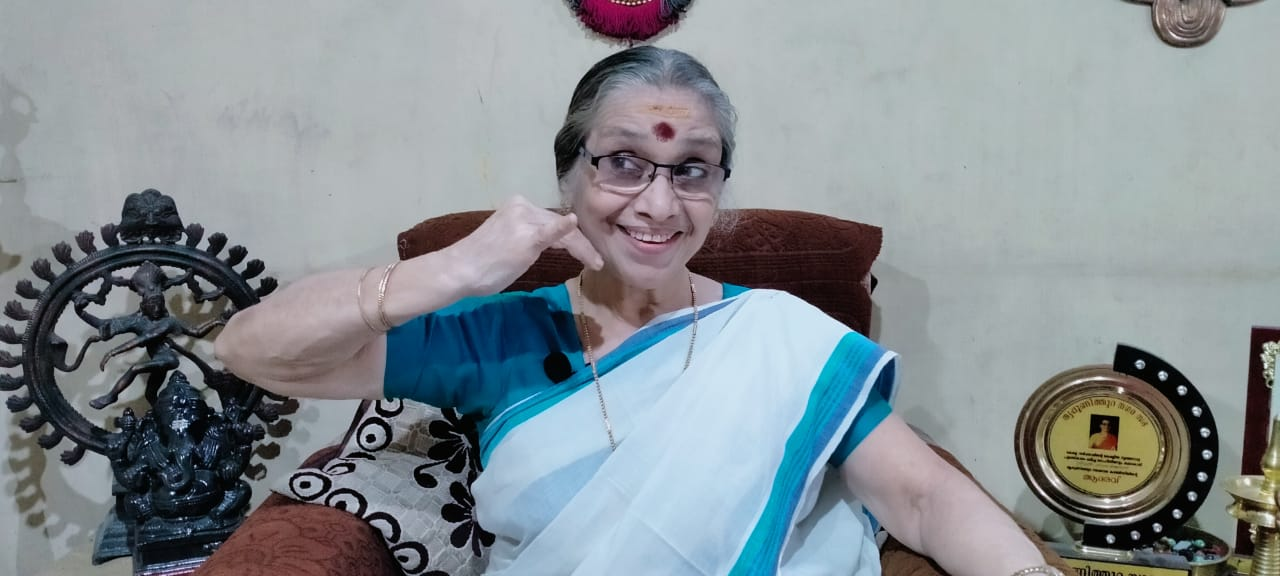
- Born: 8 May 1944 (age 82); Desamangalam, Shornur
- Occupation: Indian Classical Dancer
- Known for: Mohiniyattam
- Spouse: C.K. Vijayan
- Children: Ajith Vijayan

== Biography ==
Kala Vijayan is an Indian classical dance performer, choreographer, author and actor. She is the daughter of the legendary Kathakali artist Kalamandalam Krishnan Nair and Mohiniyattam exponent Kalamandalam Kalyanikutty Amma. Kala Vijayan is trained in Mohiniyattam, Bharatanatyam and Kathakali, however she is best known for her contributions to Mohiniyattam. She is the recipient of Kerala Sangeetha Nataka Akademi Award for Mohiniyattam (1998) and the Kerala State Award for Mohiniyattam (2019). She is the Principal Director and senior Guru at Kerala Kalalayam, a fine arts institute established by her parents at Thripunithura in 1952.

== Family ==
Kala Vijayan was born on 8 May 1944 at Desamangalam village, Shornur. Her father, Kalamandalam Krishnan Nair was a legendary Kathakali artist who popularized Kathakali within Kerala and beyond. Her mother, Kalamandalam Kalyanikutty Amma, is remembered as the “Tharavattamma” or “Mother” of Mohiniyattam. She was a student of Mohiniyattam at Kerala Kalamandalam from 1937 to 1940 and played a pivotal role in the resurrection of Mohiniyattam to a classical dance form.

Kala's elder sister Sreedevi Rajan is a Mohiniyattam artist and instructor. Sreedevi Rajan has two daughters – Smitha Rajan and Sandhya Rajan – both of whom are Mohiniyattam performers and instructors. Their brother, Kalasala Babu was an Indian stage, serial and film actor.

Kala is married to C.K. Vijayan, a retired FACT employee. Her son Ajith Vijayan is a film and television actor.

== Education ==
Vijayan did her pre-university education from Maharaja's College, Ernakulam. Growing up in a family of artists, she studied Mohiniyattam and Kathakali from her mother and father respectively. She started her Mohiniyattam training under her mother at an early age and did her Mohiniyattam arangettam (stage initiation) by the age of 4. She started learning Bharatanatyam under Guru Thanjavoor A.R.R. Bhaskar. Her arangettam in Bharatanatyam happened at the age of 10. Her Kathakali arangettam happened at the age of 10 with an hour-and-half long performance of Poonthanamoksham. Kala Vijayan further did her higher studies in Bharatanatyam from Kalakshetra under the institute's scholarship.

== Career ==
Vijayan was a child artist for a professional drama troupe. She Vijayan has been a performer of Mohiniyattam, Bharatanatyam and Kathakali. She has been performing Bharatanatyam from the age of 10 to 36 and Kathakali from the age of 10 to 25. She has been a performer of Mohiniyattam from the age of 4 to 52 and still performs Mohiniyattam for selected programs.

Vijayan started choreographing dance pieces from an early age and has choreographed dance items for Mohiniyattam and Bharatanatyam. She has choreographed a Mohiniyattam item based on the story of Job from The Bible. She has composed and choreographed dance dramas like Kannaki (based on the story from Chilapathikaram) and Kalam (about the changing seasons). She has also choreographed and performed experimental dance recitals collaborating Mohiniyattam, Kathakali and Bharatanatyam. Bhavayami Raghu Rama is one such dance piece. She advocates the Katcheri tradition that has been introduced into Mohiniyattam by her mother. Vijayan has composed and choreographed one such Katcheri recital. She has choreographed 2 Chollukettu, 11 Padam, 5 Varnam, 1 Thillana and 3 Saptham.

Vijayan ventured into teaching Mohiniyattam and Bharatanatyam at the age of 14. She has taught Mohiniyattam. In an interview, Deepti Omcheri, a Mohiniyattam exponent, recollected her initial training days under Vijayan. Vijayan is the Principal Director of Kalyani-Krishna Fine Arts Academy Kerala Kalalayam and teaches Mohiniyattam and Bharatanatyam there.

Based on the scientific and classical theories introduced by Kalamandalam Kalyanikutty Amma, Vijayan has created 25 new adavus (steps) for Mohiniyattam. Vijayan has conducted research in Tantric and Gramya Mudra, which have been published in her book. Vijayan hosts and conducts a Mohiniyattam theoretical and practical video series through her YouTube channel - Kerala Kalalayam.

== Awards ==
- 1978 - Natyakalarathnam Award by Sahrudaya Samithi, Tripunithura.
- 1993 - Junior Fellowship from the Cultural Department of Govt. of India (Also received Senior Fellowship from the Cultural Department of the Government of India a few years later)
- 1998 - Kerala Sangeetha Nataka Akademi Award for Mohiniyattam
- 2006 - Swathithirunal Performing Arts Trust's Award for Mohiniyattam
- 2019 - State Award for Mohiniyattam by the Govt. of Kerala
- 2022 - Kendra Sangeet Natak Akademi Award (Mohiniyattam)
- 2024 - Kerala Sangeet Natak Akademi Fellowship

== Books ==
Vijayan has authored a book on Mohiniyattam titled Mohiniyattam: Ariyendath Ellam. It was brought out by DC Publishers in 2012. This book is included in the syllabus for Mohiniyattam in R.L.V. College, Tripunithura and Sree Sankara College, Kallady.

== Filmography ==
- Lead character in Joshy Mathew’s film Angu Doore Oru Deshath (2017) which won the Best Children's Film title in Kerala Film Critics Award (2018)
- Portrayed the role of Kalamandalam Kalyanikutty Amma in the documentary produced by her niece Smitha Rajan, "Mother of Mohiniyattam" (2019) directed by Dr. Vinod Mankara
