= Kalasala Babu =

Indian actor (1950–2018)

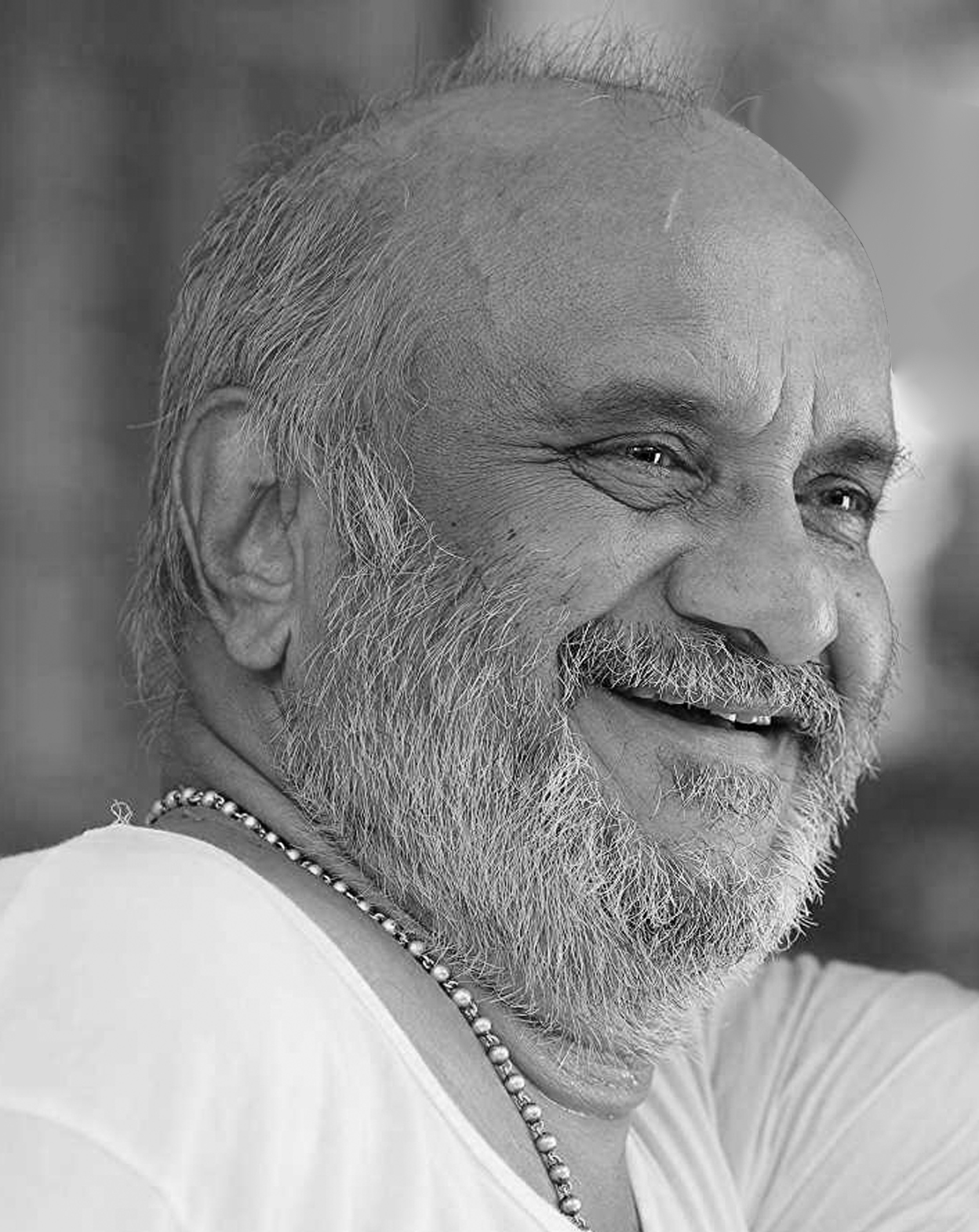
- Born: 1950
- Died: 14 May 2018 (aged 68); Kochi, Kerala, India
- Occupation: Actor
- Years active: 1977–2018
- Spouse: Lalitha
- Children: 2
- Parents: Kalamandalam Krishnan Nair; Kalamandalam Kalyanikutty Amma

Kalasala Babu (1950 – 14 May 2018) was an Indian actor who performed on stage, and acted in television serials and films.

== Career ==
=== On stage ===
Babu had been acting in radio plays while at college. Following his graduation in 1973, Babu acted in Paanchajanyam, yielding a good performance. Babu acted at Kalidasa Kala Kendram for two years, and was offered roles by the late O. Madhavan and K. T. Muhammed.

After acting in his first film Inayethedi in 1977, Babu started his drama troupe 'Kalasala' in Thripunithura, after which he was called as Kalasala Babu, and had artists such as Thilakan and Surasu, amongst others. The troupe began with the play Thalavattom, scripted by Surasu, which became a big hit. In total, nine plays were conducted and scripted by renowned personalities such as P. J. Antony, Sreemoolanagaram Vijayan, N. N. Pillai and others. The troupe operated until 1980.

Later on, he also worked with theatre company Chalakudy Sarathy for a few years.

=== Film and television ===
Babu got his first opportunity in film in 1977, in Inayethedi, the first venture of John Paul, George Kitho, Kaloor Dennis and Antony Eastman. He was cast alongside Silk Smitha for this film, which became a flop.

Towards the end of 1999, Babu was cast in Kala, a 13-episode television serial. His role of the character, Rowdy Dasappan, was well received by viewers. Following this, Babu acted in around 28 mega-serials over the next three years.

Babu made his way back into cinema with Kasthooriman in 2003, afterwards acting in character and villain roles in many movies, and achieved recognition for his performances, comfortably filling the acting space left vacant by late character actors such as N. F. Varghese and Narendra Prasad. He became more popular in the film Lion as father of Dileep. Babu acted in the popular Malayalam serial Amma as retired judge Poomankalathe Gopinatha Menon, which was daily telecast on Asianet channel from 2012 to 2015. He was paired with Kanya Bharathi and later replaced by Mammootty's brother. He also did a Malayalam serial named Sooryakaladi, which is telecasting on Amrita.

Deadline (2021) was his last film. Movie was shot in 2017 but released through OTT Platform Moviflex on 16 February 2021, and also through Theater Play OTT Platform on 1 June 2021. As an actor it is his last movie release.

== Personal life ==
Babu was born to Kathakali maestro Kalamandalam Krishnan Nair and Mohiniyattam exponent Kalamandalam Kalyanikutty Amma. He belonged to a family of artists. His sisters Sreedevi Rajan and Kala Vijayan, and his niece Smitha Rajan are Mohiniyattam artists.

He was married to Lalitha and had a son named Viswanathan and a daughter named Sreedevi.

== Death ==
On 18 January 2018, the 68-year old Babu was admitted at Amrita Hospital in Kochi after suffering a heart attack. As per reports, he became critical when he had a stroke during the emergency surgery, followed by the heart attack. Later, he was admitted to Medical Trust Hospital, where he died at 12:35 AM on 14 May 2018.

== Filmography ==
Year	Title	Role	Notes
1977	Inaye Thedi		
1977	Sreemurukan	Sukumaran	
1980	Kochu Kochu Thettukal		
1984	Ariyaatha Veethikal	Raghavan	
1988	Pattanapravesham	Sub-Inspector	
1994	Varaphalam		
2002	Chathurangam		
2003	Ivar		
2003	Kasthooriman	Lonappan	
2003	Varum Varunnu Vannu	Narendra Varma	
2003	Balettan	Raghavan	
2003	Ente Veedu Appuvinteyum	Meera's father	
2004	Sasneham Sumithra	Kurup	
2004	Freedom		
2004	Vajram	Shankaran	
2004	Runway	Varkey Chinnadan	
2004	Mampazhakkalam	"Blade" Varkey	
2004	Perumazhakkalam	Krishna Iyer	
2004	Nothing But Life	Fr. Daniel	
2005	Ullam	Raman Nair	
2005	The Campus	Fr. David Pulikkattil	
2005	Thommanum Makkalum	Thevar	
2005	Kalyana Kurimanam	Shiva Sankaran	
2005	Made in USA		
2005	Rappakal	Shekharan	
2005	Lokanathan IAS	Koya	
2005	Ben Johnson	Chandranthodi Madhava Menon	
2005	Anandabhadram	Raman Panikker	
2005	Sarkar Dada	Adv. Damodaran Nambiar	
2006	Lion	Balagangadhara Menon	
2006	Madhuchandralekha	Ramu	
2006	Thuruppu Gulan	Sreedharan Unnithan	
2006	Kisan	Education Minister	
2006	Mahasamudram	Mattakara Velu Pillai	
2006	Pachakuthira	Sugunan	
2006	Chess	Doctor	
2006	Pothan Vava	Priest	
2006	Kanaka Simhasanam	Indrasena Reddy	
2007	Avan Chandiyude Makan	Kunjukochan	
2007	Inspector Garud	Achuthan	
2007	Nanma		
2007	Rakshakan	Aswathy's father	
2007	Mission 90 Days	Commissioner	
2008	College Kumaran	Public Prosecutor	
2008	Mayakazhcha	Vadakkemadam Thirumeni	
2009	Puthiya Mukham	Sreenivasan	
2009	Black Dalia	Sunny Kuruvila	
2009	Thirunakkara Perumal		
2009	Chattambinadu	Kattapilli Kuruppachen	
2010	Chaverpada		
2010	Kaaryasthan		
2010	Koottukar	Adv. Chandradas	
2010	Neelambari		
2010	Annarakkannanum Thannalayathu		
2010	Nayakan	Raman Kutty Master	
2010	Pokkiri Raja	Achuthan Nair	
2010	Chekavar	Shekharan	
2011	The Metro	Louis	
2011	Collector	Minister Kurishumoottil Mathachan	
2011	Payyans		
2011	Sevenes		
2011	Manushyamrugam	Andrews	
2011	Koratty Pattanam Railway Gate		
2012	Mallu Singh	Adv. Chellappan	
2012	Rasaleela		
2012	Mullamottum Munthiricharum	Thankappan	
2012	Naughty Professor		
2012	Chattakkari		
2012	Nadabrahmam		
2012	Lakshmi Vilasam Renuka Makan Reghuraman		
2012	Asuravithu		
2013	Sound Thoma	Vikariyachan	
2013	Aattakatha	Ravunni Nair	
2013	Isaac Newton S/O Philipose	Fr. Alphonse	
2013	Lisammayude Veedu		
2013	Housefull	Janardhanan Nair	
2013	Dolls	Raghava Kaimal	
2013	Progress Report	Govindan Nair	
2013	Teens		
2013	Cowboy	Vinay's father	
2013	Malayala Nadu		
2013	Ayaal	Vaasu	
2013	ABCD: American-Born Confused Desi	Chief Minister	
2013	Ginger	Pappachan	
2014	Life		
2014	Njaanannu Party		
2014	Kuruthamkettavan		
2014	Flat No.4B	Military Retired	
2015	Ariyathe Ishtamayi		
2015	One Day	Sivan Pillai	
2015	Two Countries	Ullas's father	
2015	Samrajyam II: Son of Alexander	Bomb Bhaskaran	
2015	Ithinumappuram	Rugmini's father	
2015	Tharakangale Saakshi		
2016	Noolpalam		
2016	Oppam		
2016	Sivapuram		
2016	Paulettante Veedu		
2017	Sunday Holiday	Unni's father	
2017	Nee Maathram Saakshi		
2017	Nilavariyathe		
2018	Queen	Judge	
2018	Ashiq Vanna Divasam	Chacko	
2018	Shirkh		
2018	Parole	Judge	
2019	Arayakadavil		
2019	Kalippu		
2021	Deadline		

== Television serials (partial) ==
Program	Channel	Roles	Notes
Kala	Doordarshan	Rowdy Dasappan	
Kadamattath Kathanar	Asianet	Chathukutty Melan	
Swamy Ayyapan	Asianet	Moopan	
Lipstick	Asianet		
Police Story			
Alona			
Kudumbayogam	Surya TV	Sakkayi Mappila	
Vava	Surya TV		
Mattoruval	Surya TV		
Devimahatmyam	Asianet	Kannappan	
Amma	Asianet	retired judge Poomankalathe Gopinatha Menon	
Ramayanam	Mazhavil Manorama	Brahmarshi Vishvamitra	
Vallarpadathamma	Shalom TV		
Indira	Mazhavil Manorama		
Shivakami	Surya TV		
Sooryakaladi	Amrita TV		
Parassini Shri Muthappan	JaiHind TV	Ayyankara Illathu Vazhunnor	
Sathyam Shivam Sundaram	Amrita TV	Thampuran	
Jagratha	Amrita TV	Nair	
