= Smitha Rajan =

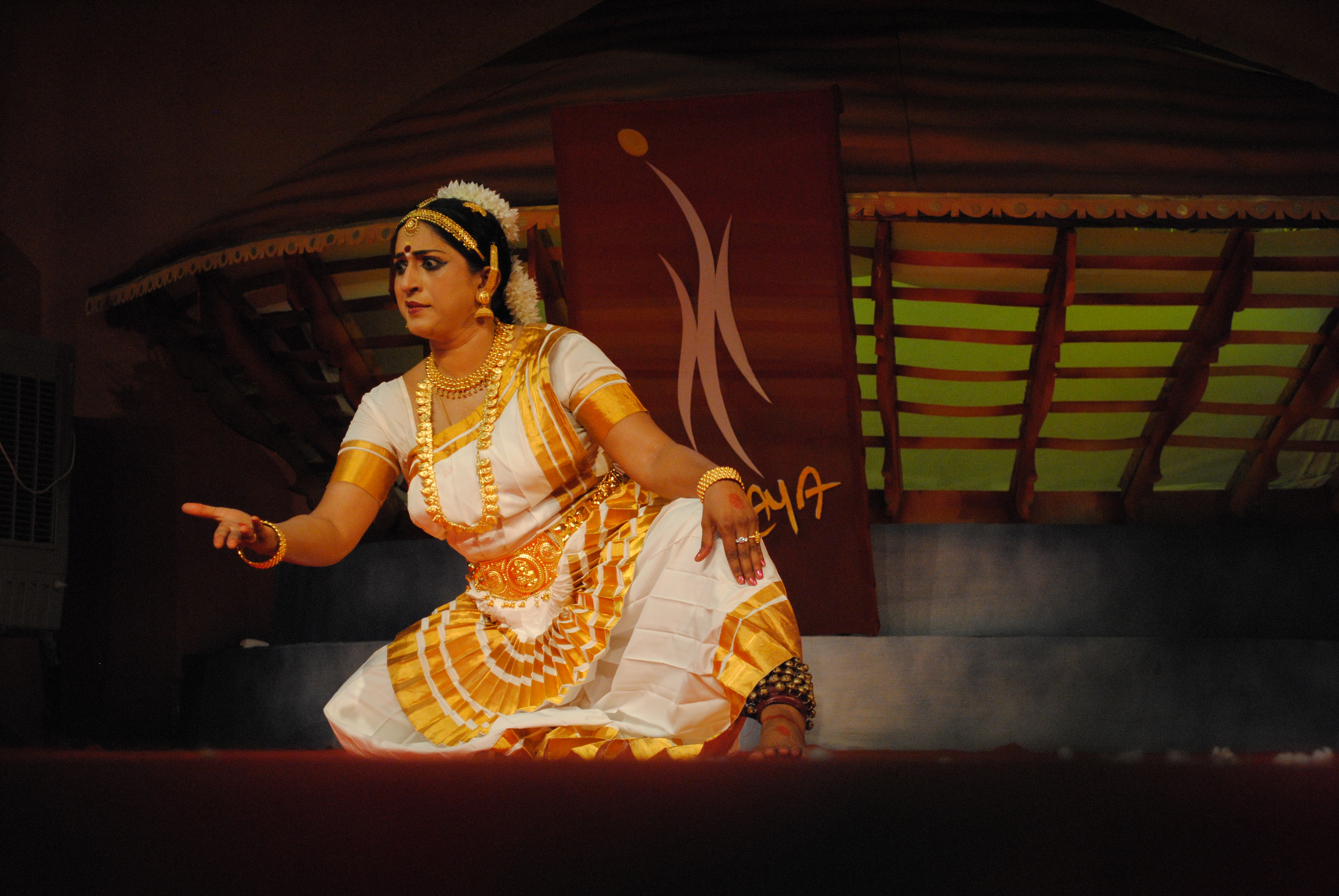
- Smitha Rajan in a Mohiniyattam posture

Background information
- Born: 1969 (age 56–57); Kerala, India
- Genres: Mohiniyattam, Bharatanatyam, Kathakali, Kuchipudi
- Website: http://www.smitharajan.com/

Smitha Rajan (born in 1969) is an Indian Mohiniyattam performer from Kerala and granddaughter of the Indian classical dancers Padma Shri Kalamandalam Krishnan Nair and Kalamandalam Kalyanikutty Amma.

== Biography ==
Smitha Rajan started her dance training at her maternal grandparents' residence in Tripunithura near Kochi. As a child, Smitha was surrounded by dance and music. Smitha's aunt, Kala Vijayan (a recipient of the Kerala Sangeetha Nataka Akademi Award for Mohiniyattam) was the first to notice talent in young Smitha during a master class at her grandparents' institution, Kerala Kalalayam in Tripunithura. Smitha's aunt saw Smitha performing a full Cholkettu (the first item in a typical Mohiniyattam repertoire) along with the senior students. From then, Kala Vijayan started training her in Bharatanatyam. Smitha did her Arangetram in Bharatanatyam at the age of 4. Her mother, Sreedevi Rajan, taught Smitha her first lessons in Mohiniyattam and Smitha performed her Arangetram in Mohiniyattam at the age of 6. She later mastered Mohiniyattam under the guidance of her grandmother.

Her grandfather, Kalamandalam Krishnan Nair, taught her Kathakali and fine-tuned her Mukha abhinaya (facial expressions). Smitha has also undergone training in classical Carnatic music under Professor Kalyanasundaram. She taught at her parents' institution, Kerala Kalalayam, from 1983 to 1990.

Smitha has performed with many classical dancers from India in dance styles such as Bharatanatyam, Kathakali, and Kuchipudi.

She became a professional dancer at the age of 12. In 1980, Smitha accompanied her grandmother, her mother, and her mother Guru Sreedevi Rajan to popularize Mohiniyattam in India and other countries. She was the leading performer of Kerala Kalalayam from 1979 to 1992. She has assisted her grandmother and mother in teaching Mohiniyattam to a number of today's Mohiniyattam performers. In 2014, she received the Kerala Sangeetha Nataka Akademi Award.

Smitha lives in St. Louis, Missouri, along with her family, and is running the institution Nrithyakshetra "Temple of Dance" as a branch of the institution Guru Sreedevi Rajan started in Kochi, in association with the parent institution Kerala Kalalayam.

She produced as well as appeared in the 2019 documentary on Kalamandalam Kalyanikutty Amma titled "Mother of Mohiniyattam," which was directed by Dr. Vinod Mankara.
