= Louise Lightfoot =

Australian architect and dancer

- Born: Louise Mary Lightfoot; 22 May 1902; Yangery, Victoria
- Died: 18 May 1979 (aged 76); Malvern, Victoria
- Known for: Architecture, Dance

Louise Mary Lightfoot (22 May 1902 – 18 May 1979) was an Australian architect, choreographer and dancer. She was also known as Louisa Mary Lightfoot. She is credited with contributing to the cultural life of Australia through both classical ballet and Indian classical dance.

== Early life, education and career in architecture ==
The daughter of Charles Lightfoot, a schoolteacher, and Mary Graham, she was born in Yangery, County of Villiers, Victoria. She attended the Catholic Ladies College in East Melbourne. Lightfoot went on to study architecture at the University of Melbourne, graduating in 1923, the first woman to complete the program. She apprenticed in architecture in the office of Walter Burley Griffin and Marion Mahony Griffin in Melbourne. Lightfoot moved to Castlecrag in 1924 with the Griffins, working in the Sydney office and also serving as companion and cook for Marion.

== Career in dance ==
Fond of dancing from a young age, Lightfoot was inspired after seeing Anna Pavlova perform in 1926. She studied with Ivan Sergieff and Alexis Dolinoff, dancers from Pavlova's company. She also trained briefly with Daphne Deane at the Sydney Conservatorium of Music and Sonia Revid, a student of Mary Wigman. Lightfoot also met Misha Burlakov who taught her Russian folk dances. She began teaching ballet to children and left the Griffins in October 1928 to take up dance full-time. Lightfoot taught the Cecchetti method. With Burlakov, she founded the Lightfoot-Burlakov Classic Dance School which in 1931 became the First Australian Ballet. In 1931, they staged the first ballet performed by an Australian dance company, a production of Coppélia. She choreographed and produced several ballets each year, some based on classic ballets and some original.

Lightfoot visited London and Paris with Burlakov in 1937. They secured the rights to perform Diaghilev's Le Dieu bleu (The blue god). She also took classes in modern, Spanish and Hindu dance. Lightfoot next spent five months in studying Kathakali dance at the Kerala Kalamandalam. On her return to Sydney in 1938, she staged her own production of The Blue God. She then left her partnership with Burlakov and returned to India to study Kathakali and Bharatanatyam dance, living in Kerala and Tamil Nadu for the next five years. She also taught ballet to the children of the British Raj. She promoted Indian dance and organized tours for troupes in the region.

In 1947, she arranged a tour of Australia for the Kathakali dancer Ananda Shivaram. In 1949, she created a ballet Indra Vijayam, starring Shivaram. Lightfoot and Shivaram established an Indian dance school in San Francisco. In 1951, she went to Manipur where she studied a third tradition of Indian sacred dance. From 1965 to 1968, she lived at the ashram of Swami Vishnudevananda Saraswati in Montreal. She retired to Oakleigh, Victoria in 1968 and continued to promote Indian dance in Australia, also organizing tours of Indian dancers and drummers there, in Japan and in North America.

Lightfoot published Dance-Rituals of Manipur in 1958. In 1968, she published recordings of Indian music Ritual Music of Manipur.

Lightfoot died in Malvern a few days before her 77th birthday.

== Legacy ==
In 1997, dancer and choreographer Tara Rajkumar created a dance with dialogue called Temple dreaming in memory of Lightfoot which was shown in Melbourne and Delhi. In 2014, Mary Louise Lightfoot, her niece, published an e-book Lightfoot dancing—Part 1: an Australian-Indian affair. Vallathol Narayana Menon, the founder of Kerala Kalamandalam, called Lightfoot the "Australian mother of Kathakali".

Her contribution to Australia's interaction with Asian culture is documented and preserved through the Louise Lightfoot Collection at Monash University.
