= Kalamandalam Kalyanikutty Amma =

Indian Mohiniyattam dancer (1915–1999)

- Born: 1915
- Died: 1999 (aged 83–84)
- Occupations: Dancer, Teacher, Researcher
- Spouse: Kalamandalam Krishnan Nair
- Children: 7 including Sreedevi Rajan, Kala Vijayan, Kalasala Babu
- Career
- Dances: Mohiniyattam

Kalamandalam Kalyanikutty Amma (1915 – 1999) was an epoch-making Mohiniyattam dancer and researcher from Kerala in southern India. A native of Thirunavaya in Malappuram district of the state, she was instrumental in resurrecting Mohiniyattam from a dismal, near-extinct state into a mainstream Indian classical dance, rendering it formal structure and ornamentation.

== Biography ==
Kalyanikkutty Amma was born in 1915 as Atavanaṭṭe Karingamaṇṇa Kalyanikutty to Panangad Govinda Menon and Karingamana Sreedevi Amma. She was married to the late Kathakali maestro Padma Shri Kalamandalam Krishnan Nair. She died on 12 May 1999 in Tripunithura (where the couple had settled) at the age of 84. Her son Kalasala Babu was a cinema and television actor. Her daughters Sreedevi Rajan and Kala Vijayan as well as her granddaughters Smitha Rajan and Sandhya Rajan are noted Mohiniyattam artists.

== Career and contributions ==
She joined Kerala Kalamandalam as a student in 1937 and was one of the early-batch students there. Her training in Mohiniyattam was from Koraṭṭikkara Appuredatt Krishna Panicker, who was old at that time. The items that she learned were the Padam Enthaho Vallabha in Ragam Punnagavarali, a Telugu Varnam Swami Ninne Nammithira in Ragam Yadukulakamboji, a Jathiswaram in Ragam Bhairavi, a Thillana in Ragam Arabhi and a Cholkettu. Kalyanikkutti Amma also had her training in Kathakali under Pattikkamthodi Ravunni Menon. She was invited to teach Mohiniyattam in Chennai and Gujarat after her graduation in 1940. She started actively teaching Mohiniyattam since 1941 after leaving Kalamandalam and established the dance school Kerala Kalalayam in 1952 with her husband Kalamandalam Krishnan Nair.

Kalyanikkutty Amma systematized and developed the style of Mohiniyaṭṭam dance that she learned at Kalamandalam and trained many young students across Kerala. Her style is popularly known as the Kalyanikkutty Amma Style of Mohiniyattam. She reformed the recital in Mohiniyattam with seven different sets of items. She also crystallized Adavus, the basic units of dance, from the compositions that she learned, added new Adavus of her own, composed Chollus for all of them, thereby creating an Adavu repertoire involving 32 Adavus. Further, she choreographed Charis, and divided the Adavus into four groups as Taganam, Jaganam, Dhaganam and Sammisram. She reconstructed a forgotten item called the Saptham. In addition, she composed numerous Cholkettu, Jatiswarams, Varnams, Padams, Slokams, Sapthams and Tillanas in Malayalam in suitable ragas.

Kalyanikutty Amma has authored two books, out of which, "Mohiniyattam: Charithravum Aattaprakaravum (Mohiniyattam: History and Dance Structure)" is considered as an elaborate and authentic documentation on Mohiniyattam. Published in 1992 first, the book is still a reference text for Mohiniyattam students of all classes.

Noted among her disciples are her two daughters Sreedevi Rajan and Kala Vijayan as well as Mrinalini Sarabhai, Deepti Omchery Bhalla, Nirmala Panicker, Tara Rajkumar, Smitha Rajan and Sandhya Rajan

== Literary contributions ==
In addition to being a dancer and pioneer researcher of Mohiniyattam, Kalyanikutty Amma was a proficient writer. She has published poems in Mathrubhumi Azhchappathippu and has also authored a book Thrayambakam, consisting of dance dramas.

== Awards and honors ==
She received the Kerala Sangeetha Nataka Akademi Award in 1974. and the Kendra Sangeet Natak Akademi Award in 1978. She received the "Keerthi Shanku" title from Kerala Kalamandalam in 1980, "Nritta Praveena" title from Kerala Fine Arts Society in 1984. In 1986 she received Kerala Kalamandala Fellowship. In 1992, she received the Kerala Sangeetha Nataka Akademi Fellowship. Kalyanikutty Amma has also been honoured with the prestigious Kalidasa Samman in 1997–1998. She was also conferred the title 'Kavayithri' by the famous poet Vallathol Narayana Menon in 1940 for her poetry.

== Works on her ==
In 2019 her grand daughter, Smitha Rajan produced a movie, "Mother of Mohiniyattam" on the life and works of Kalyanikutty Amma which is directed by Dr. Vinod Mankara.

Kalyanikutty Amma passed the art of Mohiniyattam beyond India. The first Russian dancer, Mohiniyattam, was Milana Severskaya. In 1997, Kalamandalam Kalyanikutty Amma blessed her on the continuation of the Mohiniyattam tradition. Milana Severskaya created in St. Petersburg, Russia the first outside India school of education Mohiniattam. She founded the Natya Theater, where you can see the choreography Kalamandalam Kalyanikutty Amma in the play, dedicated to her memory. Milana Siverskaya has released a film dedicated to the memory of the guru Kalyanikutty Amma in which one can see how the guru taught dance in deep old age.

== See also ==
- Kalamandalam Krishnan Nair
- Indian women in dance
- Smitha Rajan
