= Omchery N. N. Pillai =

Indian playwright and novelist (1924–2024)

- Born: 1 February 1924; Vaikom, Travancore, India (present-day Vaikom, Kerala, India)
- Died: 22 November 2024 (aged 100); New Delhi, India
- Occupations: Playwright, novelist, poet
- Spouse: Leela Omchery (m. 1950; died 2023)
- Children: 2, including Deepti Omchery Bhalla
- Parent(s): Narayana Pillai (Sr.); Pappi Amma
- Relatives: Kamukara Purushothaman (Brother-in-law)
- Awards: Kerala Sahitya Akademi Award; 1972, 2010; Sahitya Akademi Award for Malayalam; 2020

Omchery Narayana Pillai Narayana Pillai (1 February 1924 – 22 November 2024) was an Indian Malayalam–language playwright, novelist and poet from Kerala. He wrote nine full-length plays, more than 80 one-act plays and a few novels. His plays are noted for their bold experiments in form and technique as well as the uncommon vision inherent in many of the themes. Pillai won the Kerala Sahitya Akademi Award twice: in 1972 for the play Pralayam and in 2010 for his overall contribution to Malayalam literature. In 2022, he was honoured with Kerala Prabha Award, second highest civilian award given by the Kerala Government.

== Life and career ==
Pillai was born in Vaikom in Travancore, on 1 February 1924, as the son of Omchery Narayanan Pillai, Sr., and Pappikkutty Amma. He started writing poems at a very young age. After completing his education from University College, Thiruvananthapuram, he joined the news department of Delhi All India Radio in 1951 and later promoted as Editor in their publication department. He pursued his higher studies in Mass Communication from Pennsylvania University, Watten school and New Mexico State University and worked in the Indian Institute of Mass Communication.

After working in the Chief Censors Office and the Food Corporation of India, Pillai retired from the Central Service on February 1, 1989. He later joined the Bharatiya Vidya Bhavan and worked there till December 2019.

Pillai wrote his first play Ee Velicham Ningaludethakunnu (This Light is Ours) at the behest of A. K. Gopalan who was then the Leader of Opposition in the Indian parliament. Members of Parliament K. C. George, P. T. Ponnoose, E. K. Imbichi Bava, V. P. Nair etc. acted in the play. Omchery has written nine full-length plays and more than 80 one-act plays. He founded the theatrical organisation 'Experimental Theatre' in 1963. DC Books published a collection of his 26 selected plays on 27 November 2011. Besides being a regular presence in Kerala's literary and cultural fields, Omchery was the Principal of the Delhi Bharatiya Vidya Bhavan's College of Communication Management. He was married to Leela Omchery, a well-known singer and sister of famous Malayalam singer, Kamukara Purushothaman. Leela Omcheri was from the Mankoyikkal Nair Tharavadu in Thiruvattar, near the Aadhikeshava Permual Temple. The couple had a son, S. D. Omchery and a daughter, famous classical dancer, Deepti Omchery Bhalla.

Pillai died in New Delhi on 22 November 2024, aged 100.

== Works ==
=== Plays ===
- Ee Velicham Ningaludethakunnu
- Pralayam
- Cherippu Kadikkilla

=== Novels ===
- Pralayam
- Thevarude Aana
- Kallan Kayariya Veedu
- Daivam Veendum Thettiddharikkappedunnu

== Awards ==
- 1972: Kerala Sahitya Akademi Award for Pralayam
- 2010: Kerala Sahitya Akademi Award for his overall contribution to Malayalam literature
- 2013: Pravasi Kalaratna Award
- 2020: Sahitya Akademi Award, for Aakasmikam
- 2022: Kerala Prabha, second highest civilian award of Kerala
