= Inaye Thedi =

- Directed by: Antony Eastman
- Screenplay by: John Paul Puthusery
- Produced by: Antony Eastman
- Starring: Kalasala Babu; Sankaradi; Achankunju; Silk Smitha
- Cinematography: Vipin Das
- Edited by: N. P. Suresh
- Music by: Johnson
- Release date: 10 July 1981
- Country: India
- Language: Malayalam

Inaye thedi is a 1981 Indian Malayalam-language film, directed and produced by Antony Eastman in his directorial debut. The film stars Kalasala Babu, Sankaradi, Achankunju and Silk Smitha. The film has musical score by Johnson.

== Cast ==
- Kalasala Babu
- Sankaradi
- Achankunju
- Silk Smitha
- T. M. Abraham

== Production ==
Antony Eastman initially wanted to cast Shoba as the lead actress; following her death, he instead chose Silk Smitha.

== Soundtrack ==
The music was composed by Johnson and the lyrics were written by R. K. Damodaran.

No.	Song	Singers	Lyrics	Length (m:ss)
1	"Vipina Vaadika"	P. Jayachandran	R. K. Damodaran	
