= Tripunithura Kathakali Kendram Ladies Troupe =

Indian dance troupe

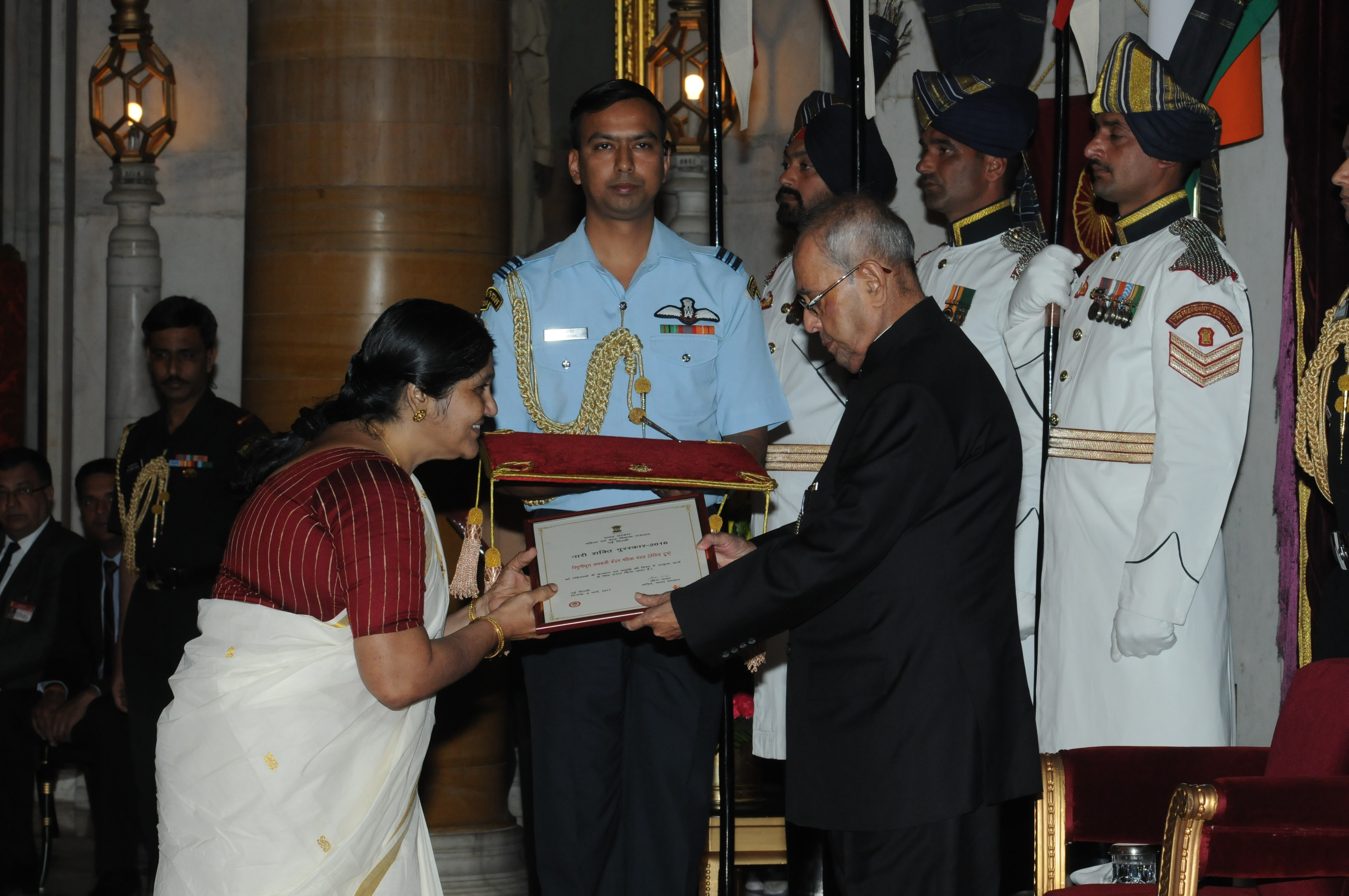
The Nari Shakti Puraskar (women's power award) is awarded by the President of India to the Tripunithura Kathakali Kendram Ladies Troupe

The Tripunithura Kathakali Kendram Ladies Troupe was formed in 1975 breaking the 300 year tradition that only men performed Kathakali dance. The troupe was recognised with an award of the Nari Shakti Puraskar on International Women's Day in 2017.

== Background ==
Kathakali dance is a classic Indian dance form that was traditionally performed by men. Dancers use masks to play different roles. This art form began in 1661 when the ruler of Kottarakkara created Ramanattam, an early version of Kathakali that dramatized episodes from the Ramayana in Malayalam, making the art form accessible to a broader audience across castes. Unlike the classical Kutiyattam tradition of Sanskrit plays, which were confined to temples and high-caste performers, Ramanattam aimed for a more populist appeal by incorporating local folk elements and performing in open, public spaces. For three hundred years it was performed only by male members of a particular high caste and it was not until the caste system was legally abolished in 1946 that others were able to train. After 1946, boys could enroll in academies, but the only route for girls was to seek out private tuition.

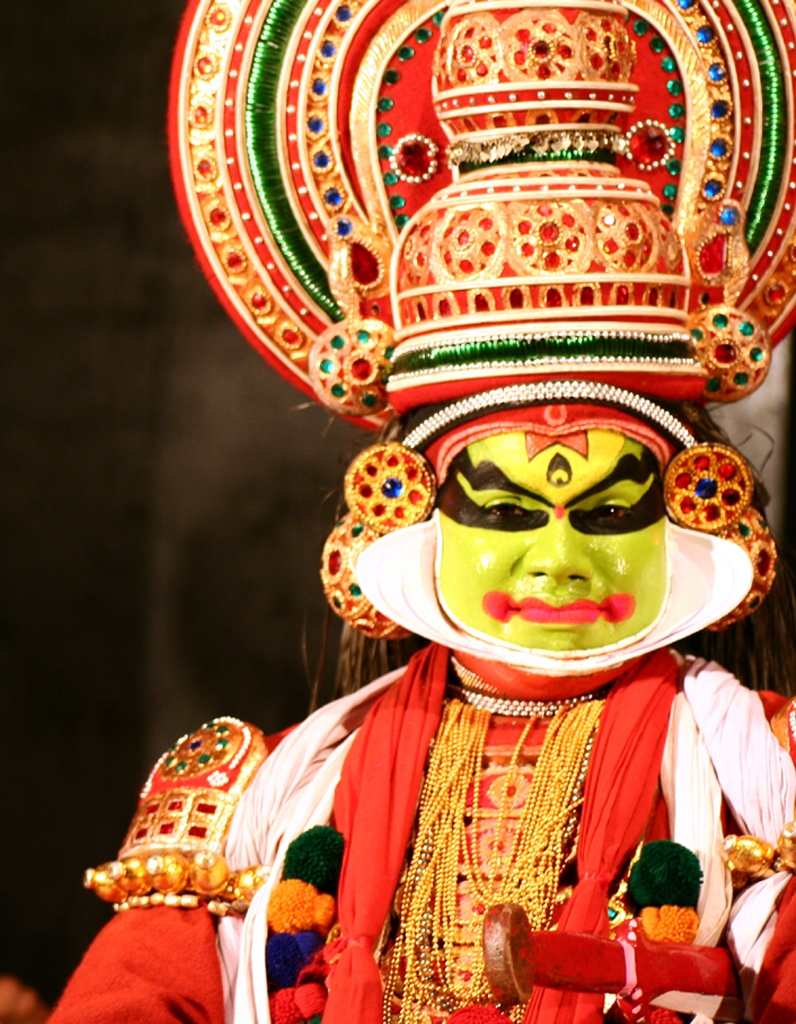
An example of a Kathakali performer

The Tripunithura Kathakali Kendram Ladies Troupe (TKK) was established in 1975, marking a significant shift Kathakali’s male-dominated history. It was not the first women's troupe as that had been formed in 1962 in Thrissur, Nadananiketan, but had lasted only until 1968. The women involved in TKK, including notable figures like Radhika Varma, chose Kathakali over more widely accepted female dance forms like Bharatanatyam, finding Kathakali’s complex storytelling and challenging techniques more artistically fulfilling. They could have appeared with male dancers as Chavara Parukutty Amma has done, but they feared the gossip and the advances of drunken men, so they preferred to form an all-woman troupe. They were trained by leading exponents including Kalamandalam Krishnan Nair who was one of the most renowned Kathakali artists, and attracted attention from academics. One group studied them for eight months.

Their "exceptional" example of "women empowerment" was recognized by the Indian government with the Nari Shakti Puraskar. On International Women's Day in 2017, a representative received the award from President Pranab Mukherjee in New Delhi.

== Training ==
Due to longstanding restrictions on women’s access to Kathakali academies, the members of the Tripunithura Kathakali Kendram Ladies Troupe (TKK) pursued a different training path than their male counterparts. Male Kathakali performers often attend dedicated academies for up to eight years, beginning with intensive training as children, which includes physical conditioning exercises to develop flexibility and strength. Since these academies were traditionally inaccessible to women, TKK members, notably Radhika Verma, learned through private instruction under respected artists like Kalamandalam Krishnan Nair. Nair, known for his expertise across all aspects of Kathakali, was particularly skilled in using subtle, expressive movements to convey complex emotions. His mastery in blending physical technique (angika) and psychological depth (sattvika) into his roles made him a well suited role model for TKK. His approach to performance, which combined precise gestures (mudras) with intense emotional expressions (bhavas), influenced their style as they adapted Kathakali’s traditionally masculine elements to create a distinctly female-led interpretation. Instead of academy-style drills, TKK members trained in a more individualized format, often in shorter, family-supported sessions that worked around their social obligations.

One key difference in training was the absence of daily uzhicchal, a massage technique administered by teachers to young male performers to help them develop the strength and flexibility required for Kathakali’s challenging stances. For women in TKK, this rigorous conditioning was neither culturally acceptable nor available, so their practice routines were tailored to focus more on expressive elements like abhinaya (facial expressions and emotional nuance) and mudra (symbolic hand gestures). This adaptation allowed them to emphasize precision in expression and storytelling, while they modified certain physical demands of the traditional training.

Given these constraints, TKK members also structured their learning around condensed, outcome-focused sessions rather than years of incremental skill-building. This approach allowed them to master complex roles with limited access to instructors or rehearsal spaces. Many TKK performers practiced at home or in local venues, refining their skills independently with guidance from family or peers. Despite these limitations, they developed a performance style that preserved the expressive and dramatic power of Kathakali while adapting to their unique training context.
