= Leela Omchery =

Indian singer (1929–2023)

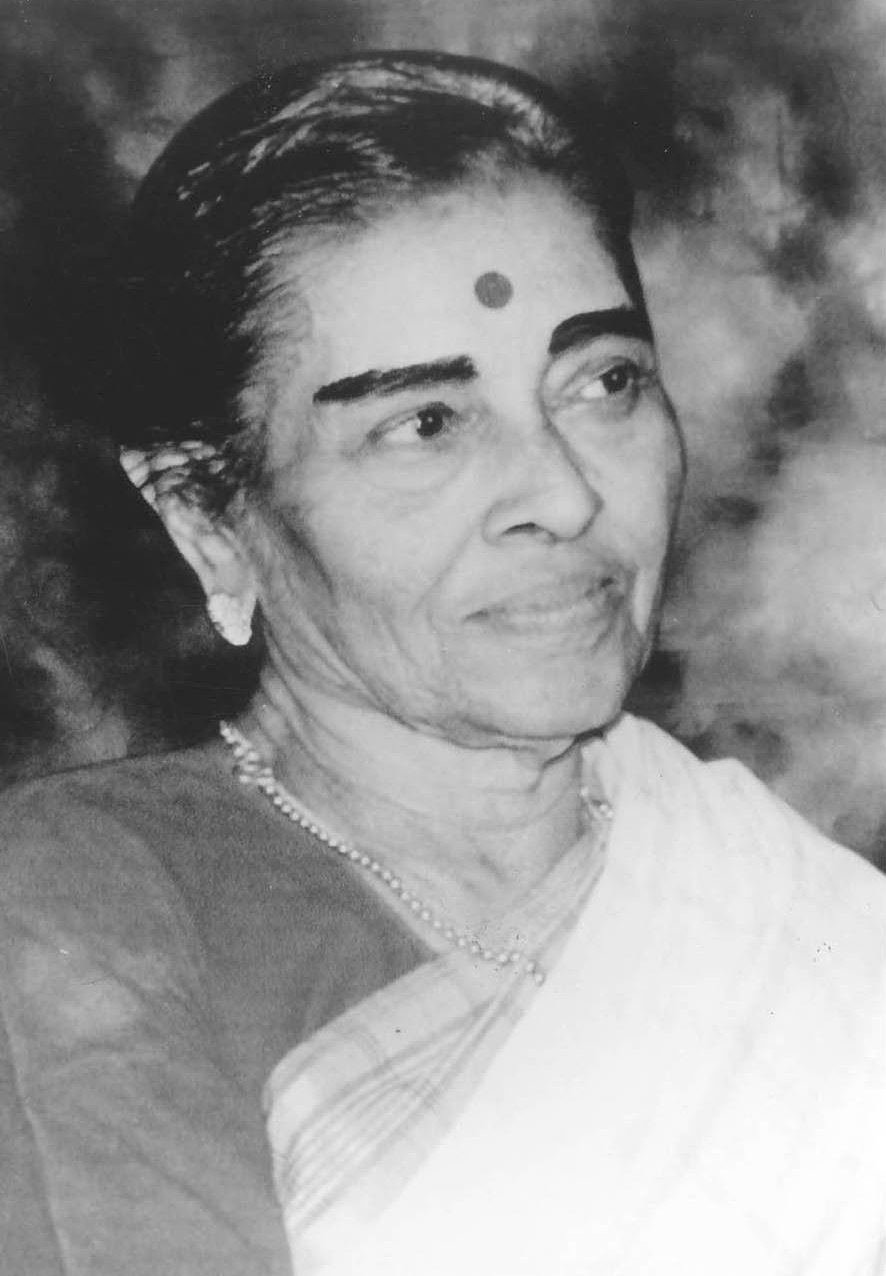
- Omchery in 2004
- Born: 31 May 1929; Thiruvattar, Kingdom of Travancore, British India (now in Kanyakumari district, Tamil Nadu, India)
- Died: 1 November 2023 (aged 94); New Delhi, NCT of Delhi, India
- Occupations: Singer, musicologist, writer
- Spouse: Omchery N. N. Pillai
- Children: 2, including Deepti Omchery Bhalla
- Parent(s): Mankoyikkal Parameswara Kurup; Lakshmikutty Amma
- Relatives: Kamukara Purushothaman (brother)
- Awards: Padmashri; Kendra Sangeet Natak Academy Award; Marunaadan Malayaali Award; Fellow – Kerala Sangeetha Nataka Akademi; Sangeeta Kulapathi; Sangeet Kovida; Kalaacharya; Sangeeta Sarva Bhouma
- Website: http://leelaomchery.org

Leela Omchery (31 May 1929 – 1 November 2023) was an Indian classical singer, musicologist and writer. She is known for her contributions to classical music and was a recipient of the Padma Shri award from the Government of India for her contributions to Indian classical dance and music.

== Early life ==
Leela Omchery was born on 31 May 1929 in Mankoyikkal tharavdu in Thiruvattar in Kanyakumari district in Tamil Nadu to Parameswara Kurup and Lakshmikutty Amma. She started learning music from an early age under a Karnatic music guru, Thiruvattar Arumugham Pillai Bhagavathar, along with her younger brother, the late Kamukara Purushothaman, a classical and playback singer in Malayalam. Hailing from a family of musicians, she had the opportunity to hone her musical talents under the guidance of her grandmother and mother who were musicians in their own right.

After early schooling in Kanyakumari, she obtained a graduate degree in Carnatic music from Government College for Women, Thiruvananthapuram and continued her studies in Hindustani music at Punjab University, obtaining another graduate degree. Her Master's degree came from Meerut University and she got her PhD in music from Delhi University.

== Career ==
Leela Omchery was working as a Professor in Kamukara School of Music, Dance and Research Studies, Thiruvananthapuram, Kerala and as Professor and Principal of Trikalaa Gurukulam in Delhi.

Omchery was the President of Dakshina Bharati (a south Indian Women’s Organization) and Vice President of Swaralaya, Delhi.

Omchery was an accredited Supervisor and Guide to Ph.D and M.Phil candidates from various universities including Delhi, Kerala, Calicut, Baroda, Nalanda, and Mumbai. She was also a member of the Selection Board of AIR, Doordarshan, ICCR, IGNCA, SNA (Delhi), the Ministry of Culture and IGNOU.

Omchery also worked as the Associate Professor and Head, Karnatak Music Section, Faculty of Music & Fine Arts, University of Delhi (1964–1994). She served as Editorial Staff of Indian Music Journal, Vageeshwari, (1975–1994).

Omchery also wrote some short stories.

== Personal life and death ==
Omchery was married to writer Omchery N. N. Pillai and resided in New Delhi. The couple had two children, S.D. Omchery and Deepti Omchery Bhalla, a classical dancer.

Leela Omchery died on 1 November 2023, aged 94.

== Works ==
=== English ===
Title	Publisher	Year
Indian Music and Allied Arts (5 volumes)	Sandeep Prakashan, Delhi	1990
Gleanings in Indian Music	Sandeep Prakashan, Delhi	1991
Immortals of Indian Music	Gyan Books, Delhi	1998

=== Malayalam ===
Title	Publisher	Year
Abhinaya Sangeetham	Bhasha Institute, Kerala	1981
Paadavum Padhavum	D.C. Books, Kerala	
Keralathile Laasya Rachanakal	D.C. Books, Kerala	2003
Chinakkara Koothu Paattukal	Mudra Books, Delhi	2008
Leela Omcheriyude Pathangal	Poorna Books, Kerala	2009
Karuna Cheyvanenthu Thamsam Krishna	D.C. Books, Kerala	2011
Vettam Mangiya Kovil Paattukal	Poorna Books, Kerala	2012

=== On Other Topics ===
- Leelanjali (Short stories)
- Jeevitham (Drama)
- Parthivan Kanavu – Translation from Tamil
- Katha Bharathi – Translation from Tamil
- Aaharavum Aarogyavum

She is also credited with over 200 published articles.

== Awards and recognitions ==
- Padmashri by Government of India in 2009
- Kendra Sangeet Natak Academy Award for the contribution to Traditional Music (Sopaana Sangeetham) and popular music of Kerala in 2003
- Marunaadan Malayaali Award for Excellence in the field of Traditional music and Arts, Delhi in 2008
- Kerala Sangeetha Nataka Akademi Fellowship in 1990
- Sangeeta Kulapathi from Kalaadarppanam, Kerala in 2003
- Sangeet Kovida from Gayatri Fine Arts, Delhi in 2003
- Kalaacharya from Akhila Kerala Maaraar Mahaa Sabha, Kerala in 1990
- Sangeeta Sarva Bhouma from Astika Samaj, Delhi in 2006
- Award for overall contributions to Music and Culture, Panchavaadya Trust, Delhi in 2006
- Senior Fellowships/Associate ship for Research Projects from various prestigious national organizations like Indian Council of Historical Research (ICHR), University Grants Commission (UGC), Indira Gandhi National Centre for Arts and Culture (IGNCA), SNA (Delhi).
