= Sreedevi Rajan =

Indian mohiniyattam dancer

- Died: Kochi, Kerala
- Occupation: Mohiniyattam dancer
- Spouse: Rajappan
- Children: Smitha Rajan and Sandhya Rajan
- Parents: Kalamandalam Krishnan Nair (father); Kalamandalam Kalyanikutty Amma (mother)
- Relatives: Kala Vijayan (sister); Kalasala Babu (brother)
- Awards: Sangeet Natak Akademi Award (2024)

Sreedevi Rajan was an Indian Mohiniyattam dancer, dance teacher and choreographer from Kerala. She received the Sangeet Natak Akademi Award from Sangeet Natak Akademi, Government of India in 2024.

== Biography ==
Sreedevi was born to Kalamandalam Krishnan Nair and Kalamandalam Kalyanikutty Amma. Her sister Kala Vijayan is also a dancer. She began learning dance at the age of four at Keralakalalayam, an institution founded by her mother. She was living in her house Shreyas on Wariyam Road, Ernakulam.

She was married to the late advocate T. R. Rajappan; their daughters, Smitha Rajan and Sandhya Rajan, are both Mohiniyattam dancers who trained under their mother, Sreedevi Rajan, and grandmother, the noted dancer and teacher Kalyanikutty Amma.

She died, aged 84, on 27 October 2026.

== Career and contributions ==
While working as a Malayalam teacher at the Refinery School in Kochi, she started a dance school called Nrithakshetra on Wariyam Road, Kochi. She performed Mohiniyattam at various venues in India and outside the country.

For mohiniyattam performance, Sreedevi had choreographed two Saptams, a form of dance composition that combines dance, music and expressive storytelling. These are Jhansi Saptam, based on the life of Rani Lakshmibai of Jhansi, and Krishnakatha Saptam, which depicts episodes from the life of Krishna.

Mudraakhyam, written by Sreedevi Rajan, is a reference guide that describes in detail all the mudras used in Mohiniyattam.

== Awards and honours ==
Sreedevi received the 2024 Sangeet Natak Akademi Award for her comprehensive contribution to the field of Mohiniyattam. She received the Nithya Kalyan Award in 2025.
