= Kalamandalam Krishnan Nair =

Indian dancer (1914–1990)

- Born: 27 March 1914; Cheruthazham, Kannur, British India (present-day Kerala, India)
- Died: 15 August 1990 (aged 76); Tripunithura, Kerala, India
- Spouse: Kalamandalam Kalyanikutty Amma
- Children: 7 including Sreedevi Rajan, Kala Vijayan, Kalasala Babu
- Awards: 1967: Sangeet Natak Akademi Award; 1969: Kerala Sangeetha Nataka Akademi Award; 1970: Padma Shri; 1977: Kerala Sangeetha Nataka Akademi Fellowship

Kalamandalam Krishnan Nair (27 March 1914 – 15 August 1990) was a Kathakali dancer from Kerala in India.

== Life ==
He is a recipient of Padma Shri, Sangeet Natak Akademi Award, Kerala Sangeetha Nataka Akademi Award, and Kerala Sangeetha Nataka Akademi Fellowship.

A native of Cheruthazham in Payyanur Taluk of Kannur district in North Malabar, Kerala he was initiated into Kathakali in his early teenage years under the tutelage of Guru Chandu Panikker. By 19, he was noticed by Kerala Kalamandalam co-founder, poet Vallathol Narayana Menon, who inducted Krishnan Nair into his institute, then near Mulankunnathukavu, north of Thrissur in central Keralawhere that Krishnan Nair trained under Pattikkamthodi Ravunni Menon, Thakazhi Kunchu Kurup, Kavalappara Narayanan Nair and Mani Madhava Chakyar.

Krishnan Nair had his higher studies on Rasa-abhinaya (facial emotions which stressed on eye exercises) from the Kudiyattam maestro Natyacharya Māni Mādhava Chākyār, who too won the Padma Shri. Krishnan Nair was deeply influenced by Shri. Chakyar.

Krishnan Nair, towards the second half of his life, had made Tripunithura near Kochi his home. Kathakali was always traditionally performed by men. In 1975 a women's group was formed and they were trained by Kalamandalam Krishnan Nair. The Tripunithura Kathakali Kendram Ladies Troupe went on to national recognition.

Krishnan Nair died on 15 August 1990, aged 76.

== See also ==
- Kathakali
- Pattikkamthodi Ravunni Menon
- Guru Kunchu Kurup
- Māni Mādhava Chākyār
