= Deepti Omchery Bhalla =

Indian dancer

Deepti Omchery Bhalla (born 1957) is a professor in Carnatic Music at the Faculty of Music and Fine Arts, University of Delhi, and a Mohiniyattam dancer.

== Education ==
Bhalla was born in Delhi in 1957.

She was trained in dancing and singing by her mother Leela Omchery, a carnatic singer. She learned Mohiniyattam, the female classical solo dance from Kerala, from Kalamandalam Kalyanikutty Amma.

Bhalla attended the University of Delhi, where she obtained her bachelor's degree, masters, and Phd in Carnatic music.

== Career ==
Bhalla served as an assistant secretary at the Sahitya Kala Parishad in Delhi. She became an assistant professor at the University of Delhi in 1985. She became an associate professor in 1995, and a professor in 1996.

Her research has focused on music and dance from Kerala.

== Awards ==
She received the Kerala Sangeetha Nataka Akademi Award in 2006, and the Sangeet Natak Akademi Award in 2007.

== See also ==
- Kalamandalam Kalyanikutty Amma
