= Kathakali =

Classical Indian dance

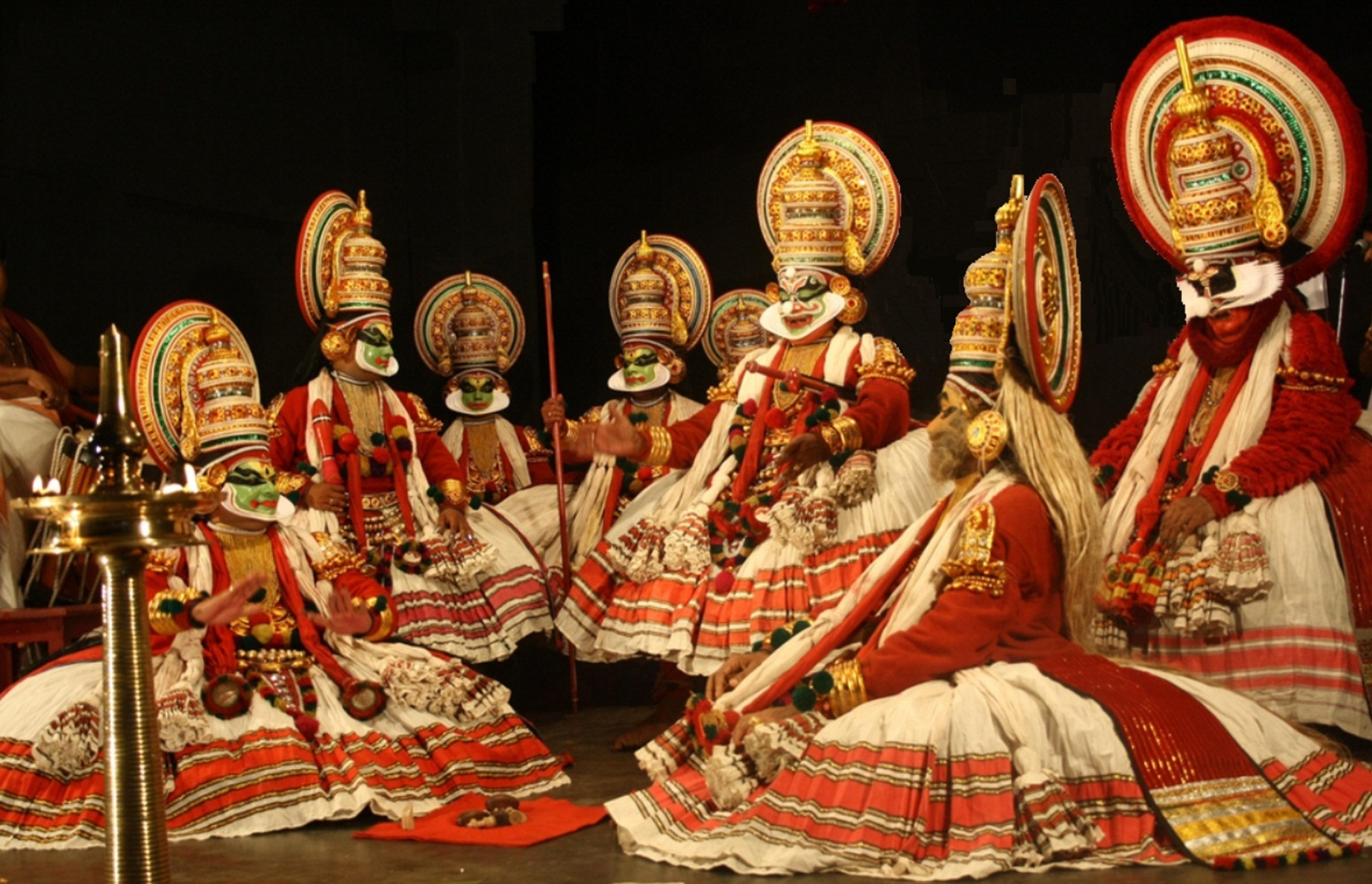
- Genre: Indian classical dance
- Origin: Kerala

Kathakali (IAST: Kathakaḷi) is a traditional form of Indian Classical Dance, and one of the most complex forms of Indian theatre. It is native to the Malayalam-speaking state of Kerala and is almost entirely practiced by the Malayali people. It is a play of verses. These verses are called Kathakali literature or Attakatha. Historically, it was primarily performed in royal courts and during festivals in temples. Hence it is known as suvarna artforms. This performance uses the navarasas from the Natya Shastra text, authored by sage Bharata. Makeup and costumes are unique and large. It represents one of Kerala's traditional theatre artforms. Kathakali is closely related to a more ancient theatre artform of Kerala called Koodiyattam, which is the only surviving specimen of the ancient Sanskrit theatre, thought to have originated around the beginning of the common era, and is officially recognized by UNESCO as a Masterpiece of the Oral and Intangible Heritage of Humanity in 2001 (and inscribed on the Representative List of Intangible Cultural Heritage of Humanity in 2008).

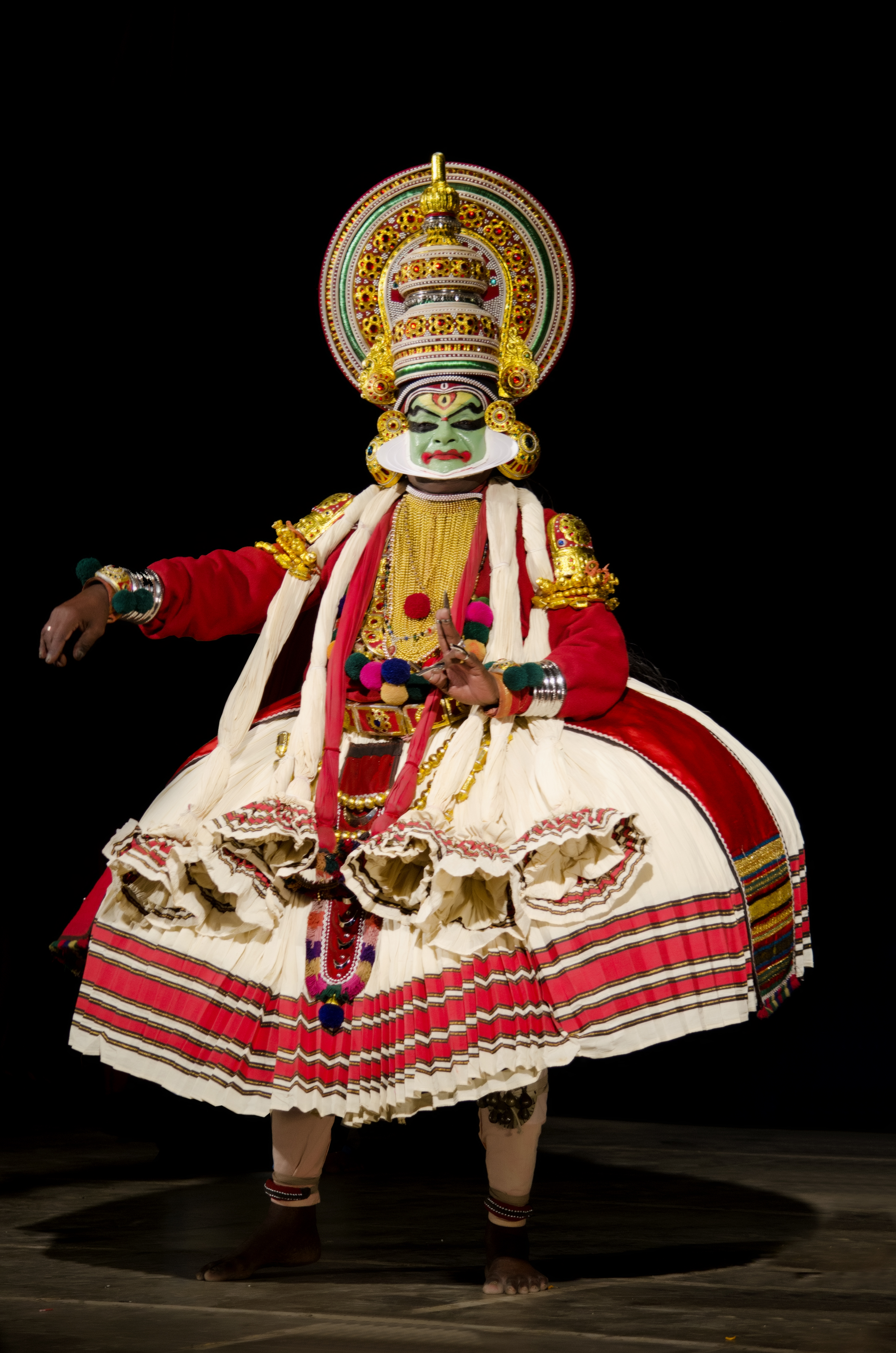
Kathakali is one of the eight classical dances of India

== Overview ==
The fully developed style of Kathakali originated around the 16th century, but its roots are in the temple and folk arts (such as Krishnanattam and religious drama of the kingdom of the Zamorin of Calicut) of the southwestern Indian peninsula, which are traceable to at least the 1st millennium CE. A Kathakali performance, like all classical dance arts of India, synthesizes music, vocal performers, choreography and hand and facial gestures together to express ideas. However, Kathakali differs in that it also incorporates movements from ancient Indian martial arts and athletic traditions of South India. Kathakali also differs in that the structure and details of its art form developed in the courts and theatres of Hindu principalities, unlike other classical Indian dances which primarily developed in Hindu temples and monastic schools.

The traditional themes of Kathakali are folk stories, religious legends and spiritual ideas from the Hindu epics and the Puranas. The vocal performance has traditionally been performed in Sanskritised Malayalam. In modern compositions, Indian Kathakali troupes have included women artistes, and adapted Western stories and plays such as those by Shakespeare. In 2011, a performance expressing Christian doctrine was staged for the first time in Kerala.

== Etymology and nomenclature ==
The term Kathakali is derived from katha (Malayalam: കഥ, from Sanskrit) which means "story or a conversation, or a traditional tale", and kaḷi (Malayalam: കളി) which means "performance" or "play". The dance symbolises the eternal fight between good and evil.

== History ==
Elements and aspects of Kathakali are taken from ancient Sanskrit texts such as the Natya Shastra. The Natya Shastra is attributed to sage Bharata, and its first complete compilation is dated to between 200 BC and 200 AD, but estimates vary between 500 BC and 500 AD.

The most studied version of the Natya Shastra text consists of about 6000 verses structured into 36 chapters. The text, states Natalia Lidova, describes the theory of Tāṇḍava dance (Shiva), the theory of rasa, of bhāva, expression, gestures, acting techniques, basic steps, standing postures–all of which are part of Indian classical dances including Kathakali. Dance and performance arts, states this ancient Hindu text, are a form of expression of spiritual ideas, virtues and the essence of scriptures.

The roots of Kathakali are unclear. Jones and Ryan state it is more than 500 years old. Kathakali emerged as a distinct genre of performance art during the 16th and 17th centuries in Kerala. The roots of Kathakali, states Mahinder Singh, are more ancient and some 1500 years old.

=== Links to older performance arts: Kutiyattam, Krishnanattam and Koothu ===
According to Farley Richmond and other scholars, Kathakali shares many elements such as costumes with ancient Indian performance arts such as Kutiyattam (classical Sanskrit drama) and medieval era Krishnanattam, even though a detailed examination shows differences. Kutiyattam, adds Richmond, is "one of the oldest continuously performed theatre forms in India, and it may well be the oldest surviving art form of the ancient world". Kutiyattam, traditionally, was performed in theatres specially designed and attached to Hindu temples, particularly dedicated to the Shiva and later to Krishna. The designs of these theatres usually matched the dimensions and architecture recommended as "ideal" in the ancient Natya Shastra, and some of them could house 500 viewers.

Krishnanattam is the likely immediate precursor of Kathakali, states Zarrilli. Krishnanattam is dance-drama art form about the life and activities of Hindu god Krishna, that developed under the sponsorship of Sri Manavedan Raja, the ruler of Calicut (1585-1658 AD). The traditional legend states that Kottarakkara Thampuran (also known as Vira Kerala Varma) requested the services of a Krishnanattam troupe, but his request was denied. So Kottarakkara Thampuran created another art form based on Krishnanattam, called it Ramanattam because the early plays were based on the Hindu epic Ramayana, which over time diversified beyond Ramayana and became popular as 'Kathakali'.

Another related performance art is Ashtapadiyattom, a dance drama based on the Gita Govinda of the twelfth-century poet Jayadeva, told the story of Krishna embodied as a humble cowherd, his consort Radha, and three cow girls. Kathakali also incorporates several elements from other traditional and ritualistic art forms like Mudiyettu, Theyyam and Padayani besides folk arts such as Porattu Nadakam that shares ideas with the Tamil Therukoothu tradition. The south Indian martial art of Kalarippayattu has also influenced Kathakali.

Despite the links, Kathakali is different from temple-driven arts such as "Krishnanattam", Kutiyattam and others because unlike the older arts where the dancer-actor also had to be the vocal artist, Kathakali separated these roles allowing the dancer-actor to excel in and focus on choreography while the vocal artists focused on delivering their lines. Kathakali also expanded the performance repertoire, style and standardized the costume making it easier for the audience to understand the various performances and new plays.

== Repertoire ==
Kathakali is structured around plays called Attakatha (literally, "enacted story"), written in Sanskritized Malayalam. These plays are written in a particular format that helps identify the "action" and the "dialogue" parts of the performance. The Sloka part is the metrical verse, written in third person – often entirely in Sanskrit - describing the action part of the choreography. The Pada part contains the dialogue part. These Attakatha texts grant considerable flexibility to the actors to improvise. Historically, all these plays were derived from Hindu texts such as the Ramayana, the Mahabharata and the Bhagavata Purana.

A Kathakali repertoire is an operatic performance where an ancient story is playfully dramatized. Traditionally, a Kathakali performance is long, starting at dusk and continuing through dawn, with interludes and breaks for the performers and audience. Some plays continued over several nights, starting at dusk every day. Modern performances are shorter. The stage with seating typically in open grounds outside a temple, but in some places, special theatres called Kuttampalam built inside the temple compounds have been in use.

The stage is mostly bare, or with a few drama-related items. One item, called a Kalivilakku (kali meaning dance; vilakku meaning lamp), can be traced back to Kutiyattam. In both traditions, the performance happens in the front of a huge Kalivilakku with its thick wick sunk in coconut oil, burning with a yellow light. Traditionally, before the advent of electricity, this special large lamp provided light during the night. As the play progressed, the actor-dancers would gather around this lamp so that the audience could see what they are expressing.

The performance involves actor-dancers in the front, supported by musicians in the background stage on right (audience's left) and with vocalists in the front of the stage (historically so they could be heard by the audience before the age of microphone and speakers). (Note: Modern performances with microphone and speakers sometimes position the vocalists in the back.) Typically, all roles are played by male actor-dancers, though in modern performances, women have been welcomed into the Kathakali tradition.

=== Costumes ===
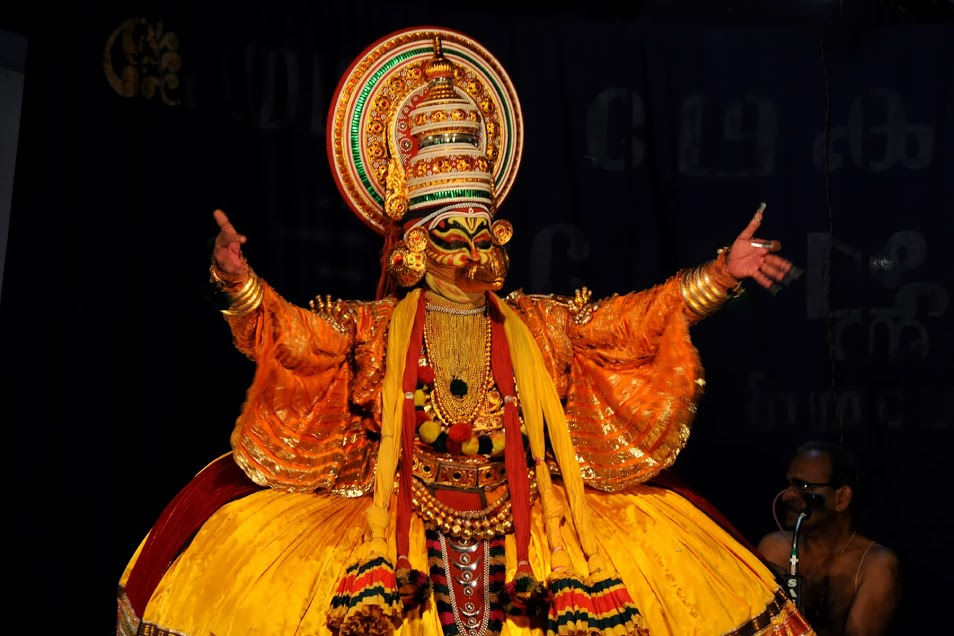
Kathakali artist K.G. Vasudevan Nair

Of all classical Indian dances, Kathakali has the most elaborate costumes, consisting of head dresses(കിരീടം), vests, face masks and vividly painted faces. It typically takes several evening hours to prepare a Kathakali troupe to get ready for a play. Costumes have made Kathakali's popularity extend beyond adults, with children absorbed by the colors, makeup, lights and sounds of the performances.

The makeup follows an accepted code, that helps the audience easily identify the archetypal characters such as gods, goddesses, demons, demonesses, saints, animals and characters of a story. Seven basic makeup types are used in Kathakali, namely Pachcha (green), Pazhuppu (ripe), Kathi, Kari, Thaadi, Minukku and Teppu (red). These vary with the styles and the predominant colours made from rice paste and vegetable colors that are applied on the face. Pachcha (green) with lips painted brilliant coral red portrays noble characters and sages such as Krishna, Vishnu, Rama, Yudhishthira, Arjuna, Nala and philosopher-kings.

Thaadi (red) is the code for someone with an evil streak such as Dushasana .

Kathi (knife) characters have a green face (representing heroic or excellence as a warrior) with red dots or lines on their cheeks or red-coloured knife like moustache or red-streaked beard (representing evil inner nature), while others have a full face and beard coloured red, the latter implying excessively evil characters.

Kari (black) is the code for forest dwellers, hunters, and middle ground character. Demonesses and treacherous characters are also painted black but with streaks or patches of red.

Yellow is the code for monks, mendicants, and women. Minukka (radiant, shining) with a warm yellow, orange or saffron typifies noble, virtuous feminine characters such as Sita, Panchali and Mohini. Men who act the roles of women also add a false top knot to their left and decorate it in a style common to the region. Vella Thadi (white beard) represents a divine being, someone with virtuous inner state and consciousness such as Hanuman. Teppu is for special characters found in Hindu mythologies, such as Garuda, Jatayu and Hamsa who act as messengers or carriers, but do not fit the other categories. Face masks and headgear is added to accentuate the inner nature of the characters. The garments colours have a similar community accepted code of silent communication.

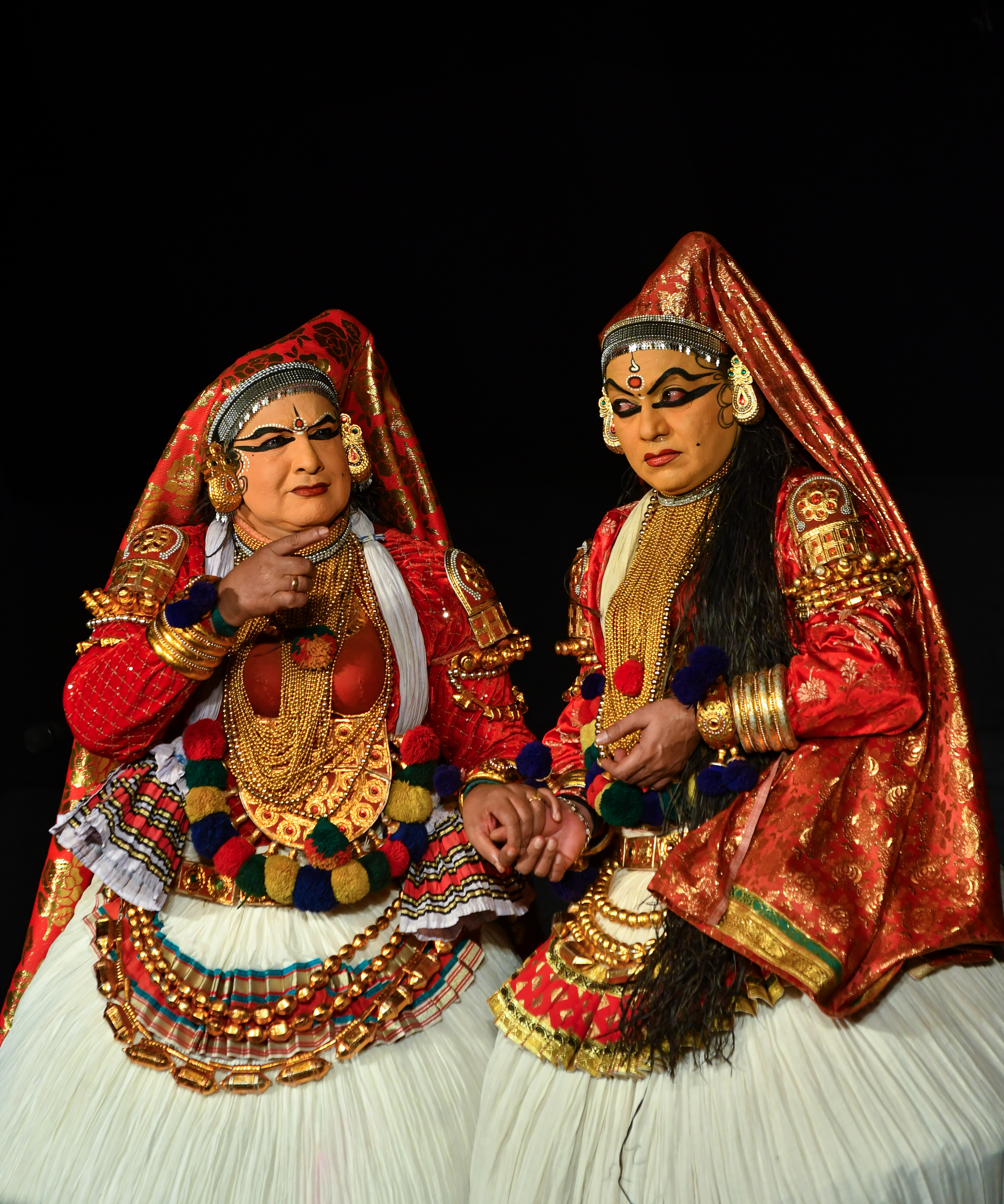
Minukka, the feminine character

The character types, states Zarrilli, reflect the Guṇa theory of personalities in the ancient Samkhya school of Hindu philosophy. There are three Guṇas, according to this philosophy, that have always been and continue to be present in all things and beings in the world. These three Guṇas are sattva (goodness, constructive, harmonious, virtuous), rajas (passion, aimless action, dynamic, egoistic), and tamas (darkness, destructive, chaotic, viciousness). All of these three gunas (good, evil, active) are present in everyone and everything, it is the proportion that is different, according to the Hindu worldview. The interplay of these gunas defines the character of someone or something, and the costumes and face colouring in Kathakali often combines the various colour codes to give complexity and depth to the actor-dancers.

=== Makeup ===
In Kathakali, the makeup known as Chutti (ചുട്ടി) is both symbolic and artistic. It goes beyond mere decoration; the colors and patterns are carefully designed to represent and distinguish various character types

- Green (പച്ച): This base color represents noble and heroic characters who embody virtue, such as kings, divine beings, and idealized heroes.
- Red and Black Accents (കത്തി and കരി): These are used to depict villainous or demonic characters. Kathi (knife) characters are anti-heroes or arrogant villains, while Kari (black) denotes demons or forest-dwelling evil beings.
- Soft Yellow or Orange (മിനുക്കു): Typically applied to female characters or sages, this coloring signifies gentleness, spirituality, and inner peace.

=== Acting ===
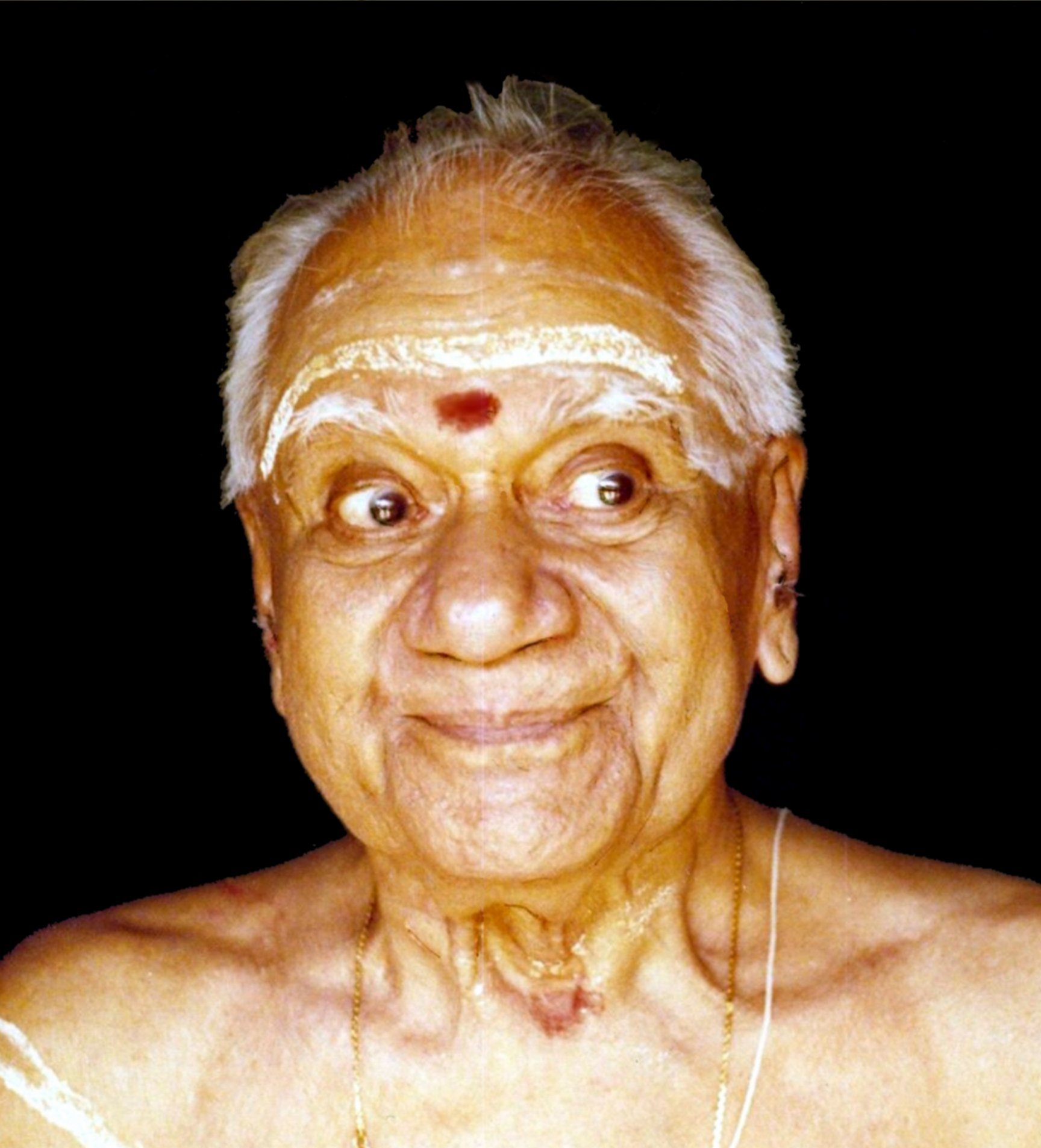
Sringara, one of the nine facial expressions mentioned in Natyasastra

Like many classical Indian arts, Kathakali is choreography as much as it is acting. It is said to be one of the most difficult styles to execute on stage, with young artists preparing for their roles for several years before they get a chance to do it on stage. The actors speak a "sign language", where the word part of the character's dialogue is expressed through "hand signs (mudras)", while emotions and mood is expressed through "facial and eye" movements. In parallel, vocalists in the background sing rhythmically the play, matching the beats of the orchestra playing, thus unifying the ensemble into a resonant oneness.

Several ancient Sanskrit texts such as Natya Shastra and Hastha Lakshanadeepika discuss hand gestures or mudras. Kathakali follows the Hastha Lakshanadeepika most closely, unlike other classical dances of India.

There are 24 main mudras, and numerous more minor ones in Kathakali. There are nine facial expressions called Navarasas, which each actor masters through facial muscle control during his education, in order to express the emotional state of the character in the play. The theory behind the Navarasas is provided by classical Sanskrit texts such as Natya Shastra, but sometimes with different names, and these are found in other classical Indian dances as well. The Navarasas express nine bhava-s (emotions) in Kathakali as follows:

1. Sringara expresses Rati (love, pleasure, delight)
2. Hasya expresses Hasa (comic, laugh, mocking)
3. Karuna expresses Shoka (pathetic, sad)
4. Raudra expresses Krodha (anger, fury)
5. Vira expresses Utsaha (vigor, enthusiasm, heroic)
6. Bhayanaka expresses Bhaya (fear, concern, worry)
7. Bibhatsa expresses Jugupsa (disgust, repulsive)
8. Adbhuta expresses Vismaya (wondrous, marvel, curious)
9. Shanta expresses Sama (peace, tranquility).

=== Sequence ===
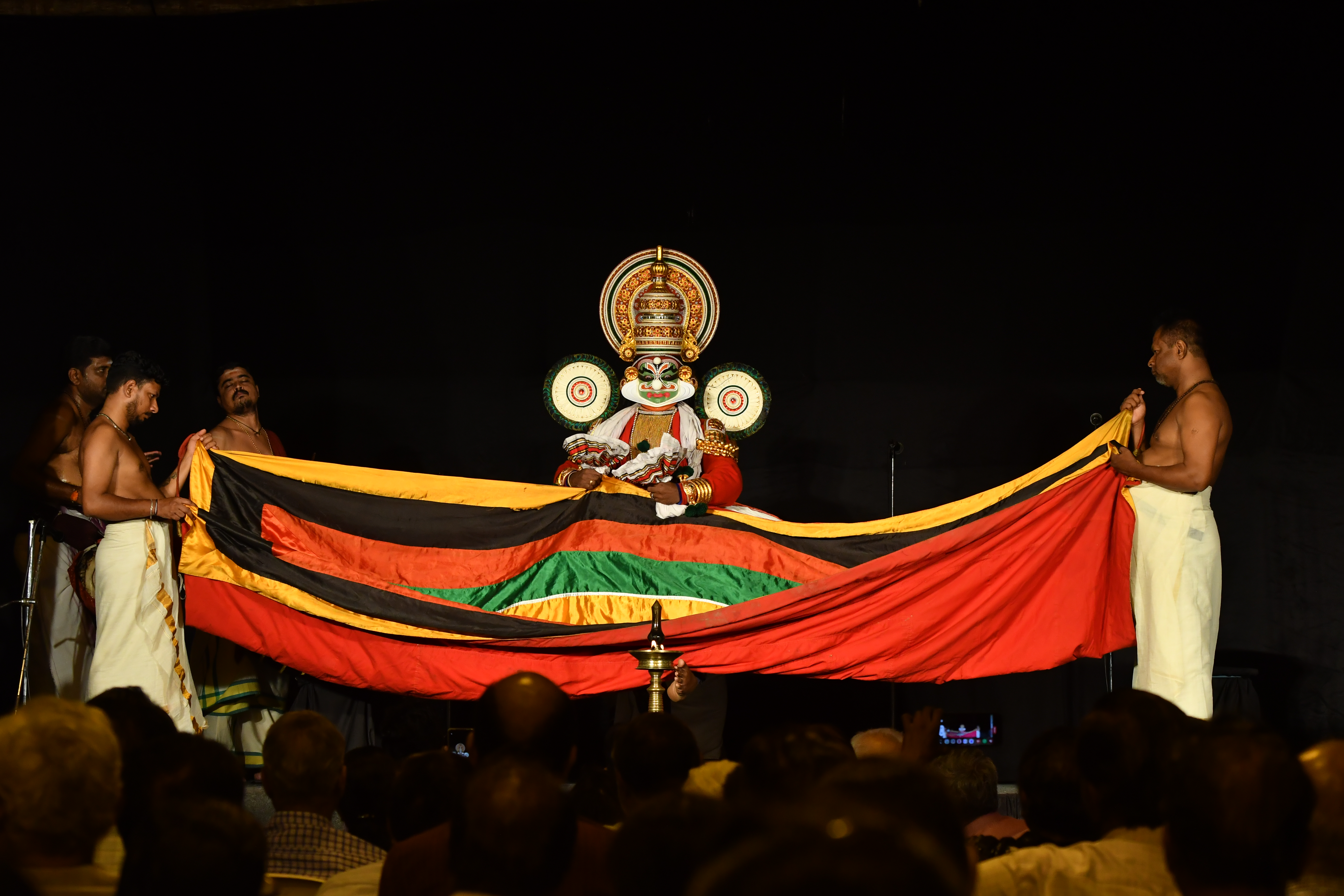

A Kathakali performance typically starts with artists tuning their instruments and warming up with beats, signalling to the arriving audience that the artists are getting ready and the preparations are on. The repertoire includes a series of performances. First comes the Thodayam and Purappadu performances, which are preliminary 'pure' (abstract) dances that emphasize skill and pure motion. Thodayam is performed behind a curtain and without all the costumes, while Purappadu is performed without the curtain and in full costumes.

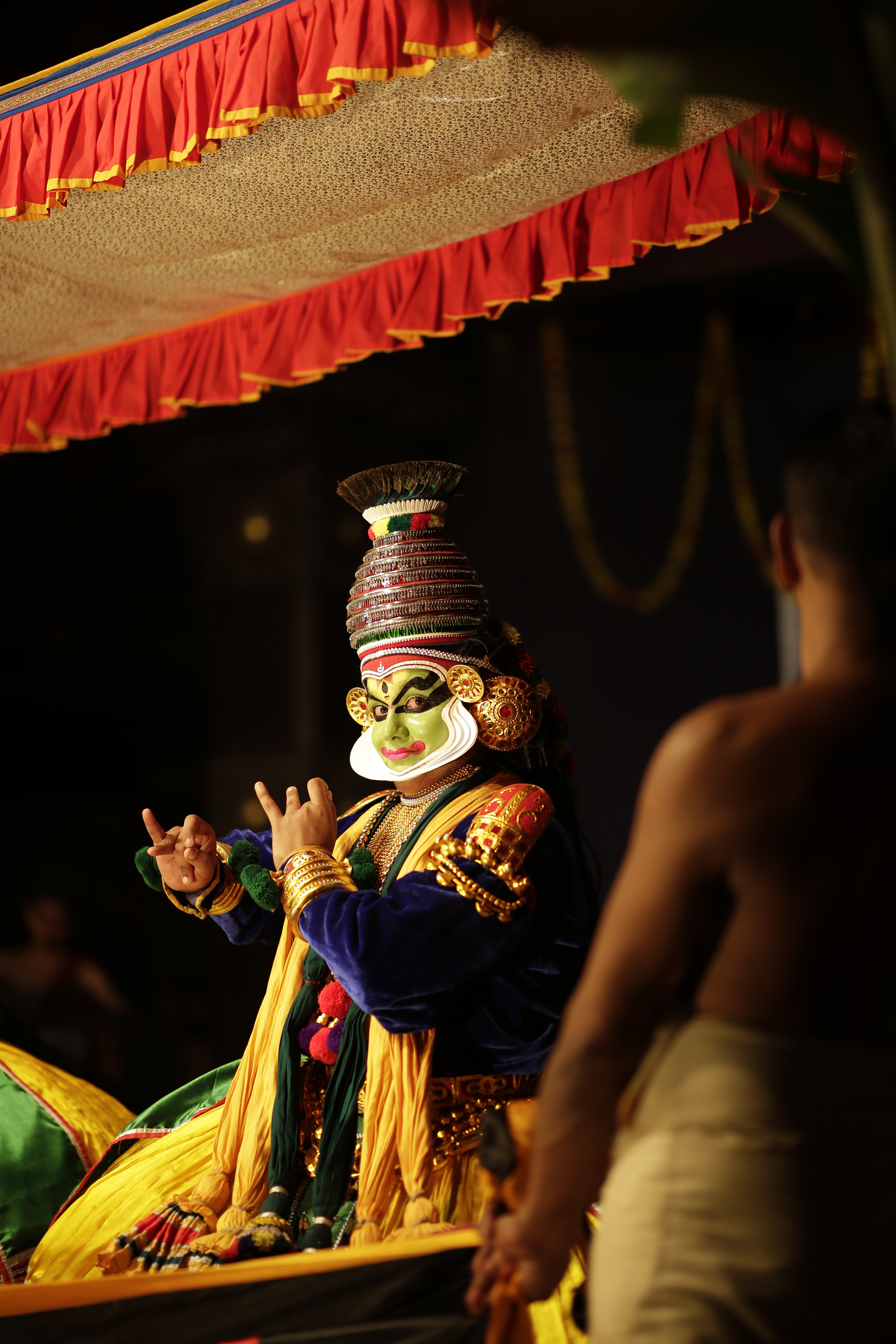
Kathakali Krishna Vesham (Kalamandalam sivadath)

The expressive part of the performance, which constitutes the dance-drama, is split into four types: Kalasham (major and most common), Iratti (special, used with battles-related Chempata rhythm), Thonkaram (similar to Iratti but different music), and Nalamiratti (used for exits or link between the chapters of the play).

The entrance of characters onto the Kathakali stage can be varied. Many of these ways are not found in other major Indian classical dance traditions. Kathakali employs several methods:

1. direct without special effects or curtain
2. through the audience, a method that engages the audience, led by torchbearers since Kathakali is typically a night performance
3. tease and suspense called nokku or thirasheela or tiranokku, where the character is slowly revealed by the use of a curtain. The "tease" method is typically used for characters with hidden, dangerous intentions.

== Songs and musical instruments ==
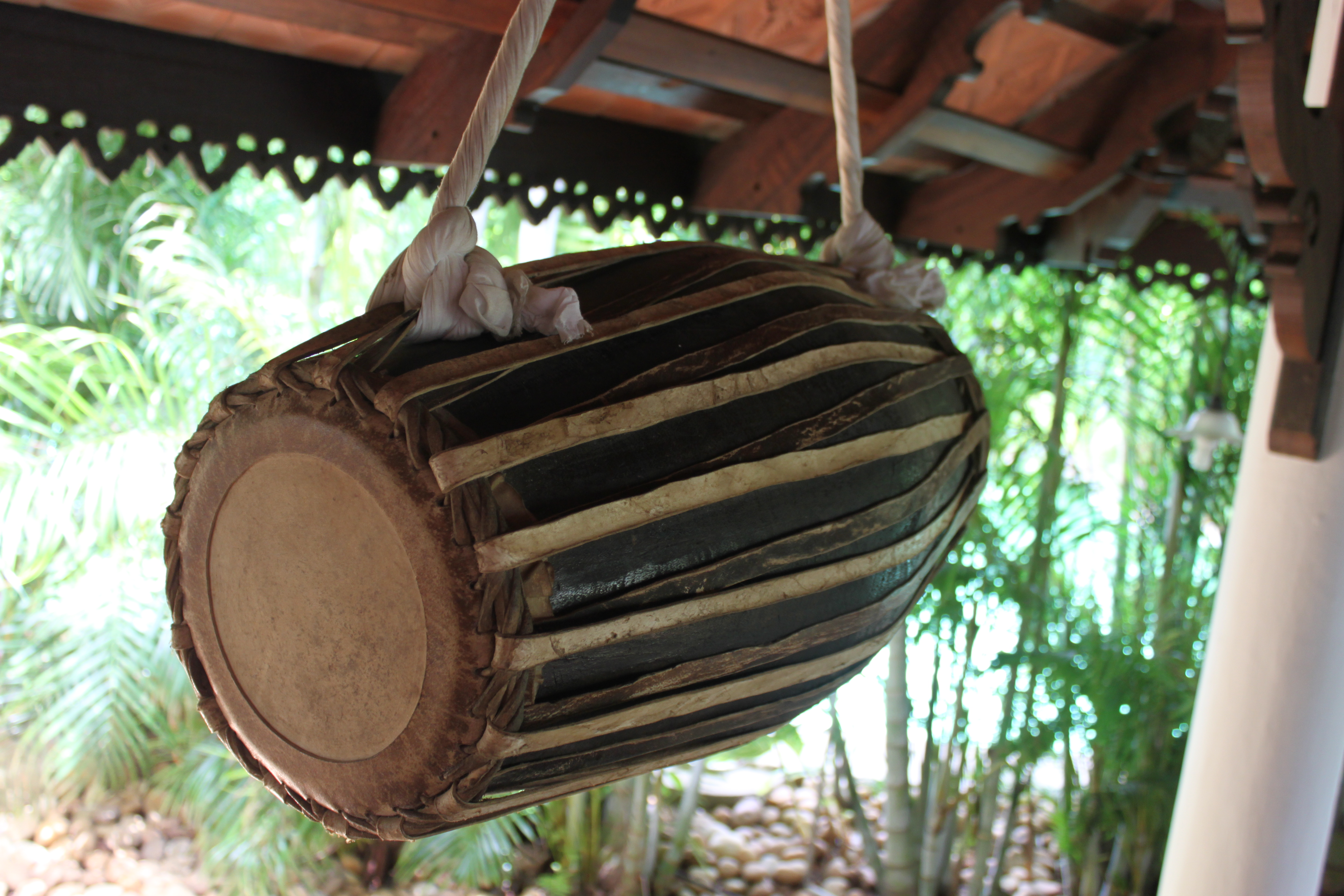
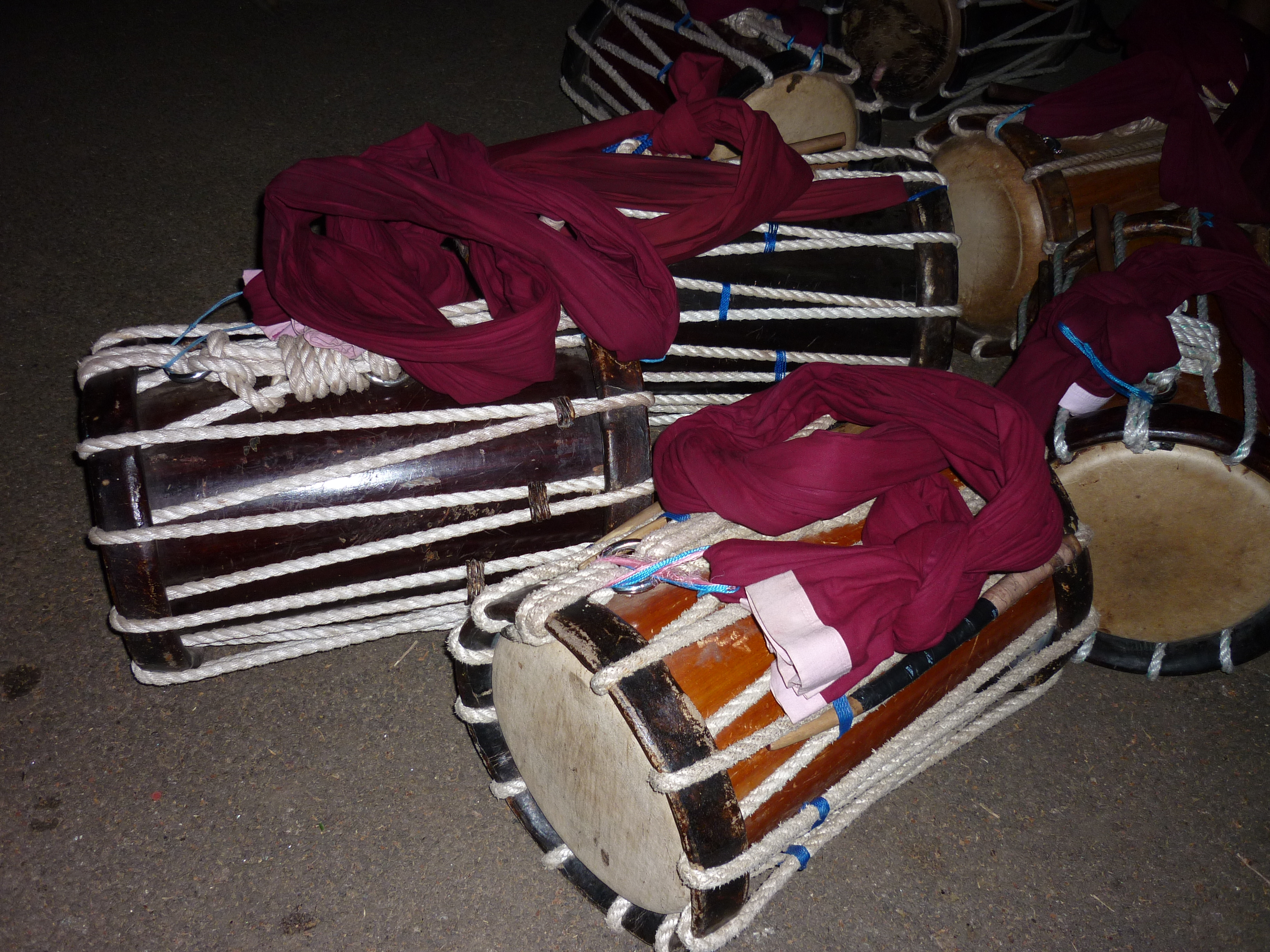
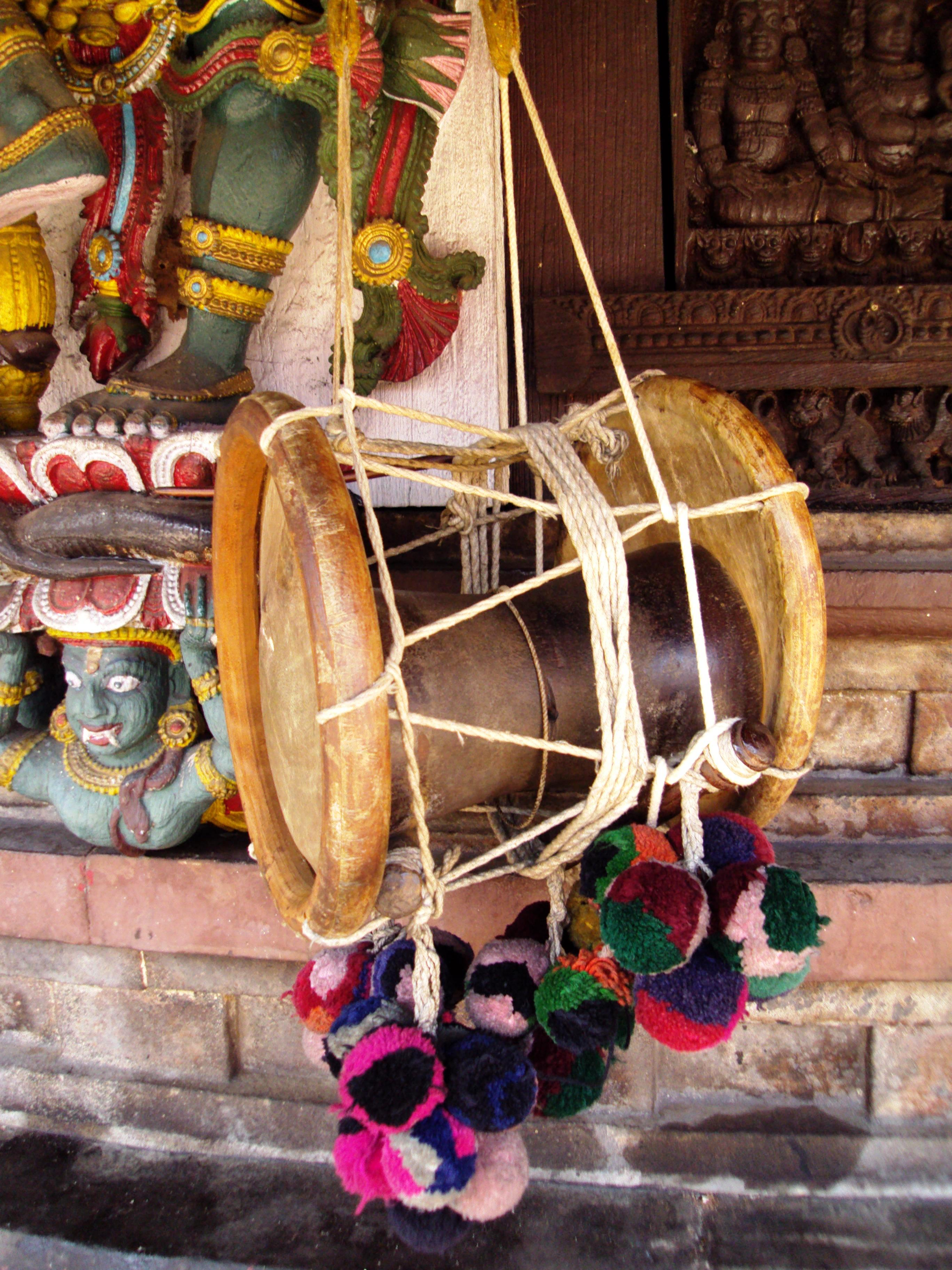
Three types of drums of Kathakali: Maddalam (left), Chenda and Idakka (right)

The play is in the form of verses that are metered and lyrical, sung by vocalists whose voice has been trained to various melodies (ragas), music and synchronized with the dance-acting on the stage. The vocalists not only deliver the lines, but help set the context and express the inner state of the character by modulating their voice. For example, anger is expressed by the use of sharp high voice and pleading is expressed by the use of a sad tone.

Music is central to a Kathakali performance. It sets the mood and triggers emotions resonant with the nature of the scene. It also sets the rhythm to which the actor-dancers perform the choreography and scenes. Some major musical patterns, according to Clifford and Betty, that go with the moods and content of the scene are: Chempada (most common and default that applies to a range of moods, in battles and fights between good and evil, also to conclude a scene); Chempa music (depict tension, dispute, disagreement between lovers or competing ideas); Panchari (for odious, preparatory such as sharpening a sword); Triputa (thought-provoking, scenes involving sages and teachers); Adantha (scenes involving kings or divine beings); Muri Adantha musical style (for comic, light-hearted, or fast-moving scenes involving heroic or anger-driven activity).

Many musical instruments are used in Kathakali. Three major drums found are Maddalam(barrel-shaped), Chenda (cylindrical drum played with curved sticks) and Idakka (Idakka, hourglass-shaped drum with muted and melodious notes played when female characters perform).

Traditional plays

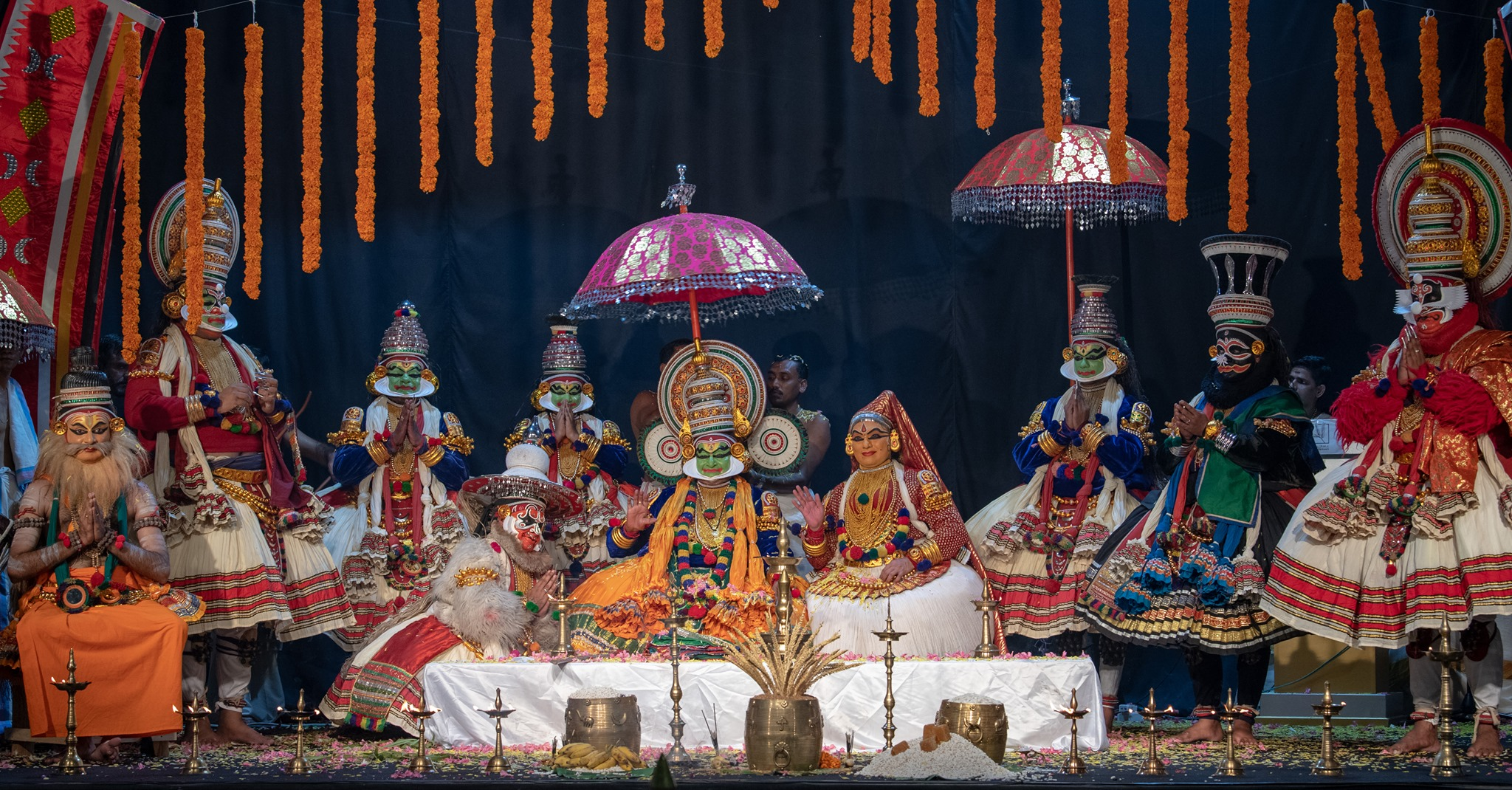
SreeRama Pattabhishekam Kathakali

Over five hundred Kathakali plays called Aattakatha exist, most of which were written before the 20th century. Of these, about four dozen are most actively performed. These plays are sophisticated literary works, states Zarrilli, and only five authors have written more than two plays. The late 17th century Unnayi Variyar, in his short life, produced four plays which are traditionally considered the most expressive of the Kathakali playwrights. Typically, his four plays are performed on four nights, and they relate to the mythical Hindu love story of Nala and Damayanti. The Nala-Damayanti story has roots in the texts of 1st millennium BCE and is found in the Mahabharata, but the Kathakali play version develops the characters, their inner states, the emotions and their circumstances far more than the older texts.

A tradition Kathakali play typically consists of two interconnected parts, the third-person Shlokas and first-person Padams. The Shlokas are in Sanskrit and describe the action in the scene, while Padams are dialogues in Malayalam (Sanskritized) for the actors to interpret and play. A Padam consists of three parts: a Pallavi (refrain), Anupallavi (subrefrain) and Charanam (foot), all of which are set to one of the ancient Ragas (musical mode), based on the mood and context as outlined in ancient Sanskrit texts such as the Natya Shastra. In historic practice of a play performance, each Padam was enacted twice by the actor while the vocalists sang the lines repeatedly as the actor-dancer played his role out.

The traditional plays were long, many written to be performed all night, some such as those based on the Ramayana and the Mahabharata written to be performed for many sequential nights. However, others such as the Prahlada Charitham have been composed so that they can be performed within four hours. Modern productions have extracted parts of these legendary plays, to be typically performed within 3 to 4 hours.

=== Offshoots and modern adaptations ===
Kathakali is still practiced in its Traditional ways and there are experimental plays based on European classics and Shakespeare's plays. Recent productions have adapted stories from other cultures and mythologies, such as those of Miguel de Cervantes, Johann Wolfgang von Goethe and William Shakespeare.

== Styles: Sampradayam ==
Kathakali has lineages or distinctive schools of play interpretation and dance performance called Sampradayam. These developed in part because of the gurukula system of transmission from one generation to the next. By the 19th-century, many such styles were in vogue in Kerala, of which two major styles have crystallized and survived into the modern age.

The Kidangoor style is one of the two, that developed in Travancore, and it is strongly influenced by Kutiyattam, while also drawing elements of Ramanattam and Kalladikkotan. It is traditionally attributed to Nalanunni, under the patronage of Utram Tirunal Maharaja (1815-1861).

The Kalluvazhi style is second of the two, which developed in Palakkad (Olappamanna Mana) in central Kerala, and it is a synthesis of the older Kaplingadan and Kalladikkotan performance arts. It is traditionally attributed to Unniri Panikkar, in a Brahmin household (~1850), and became the dominant style established in Kerala Kalamandalam – a school of performance arts.

== Training centres and awards ==
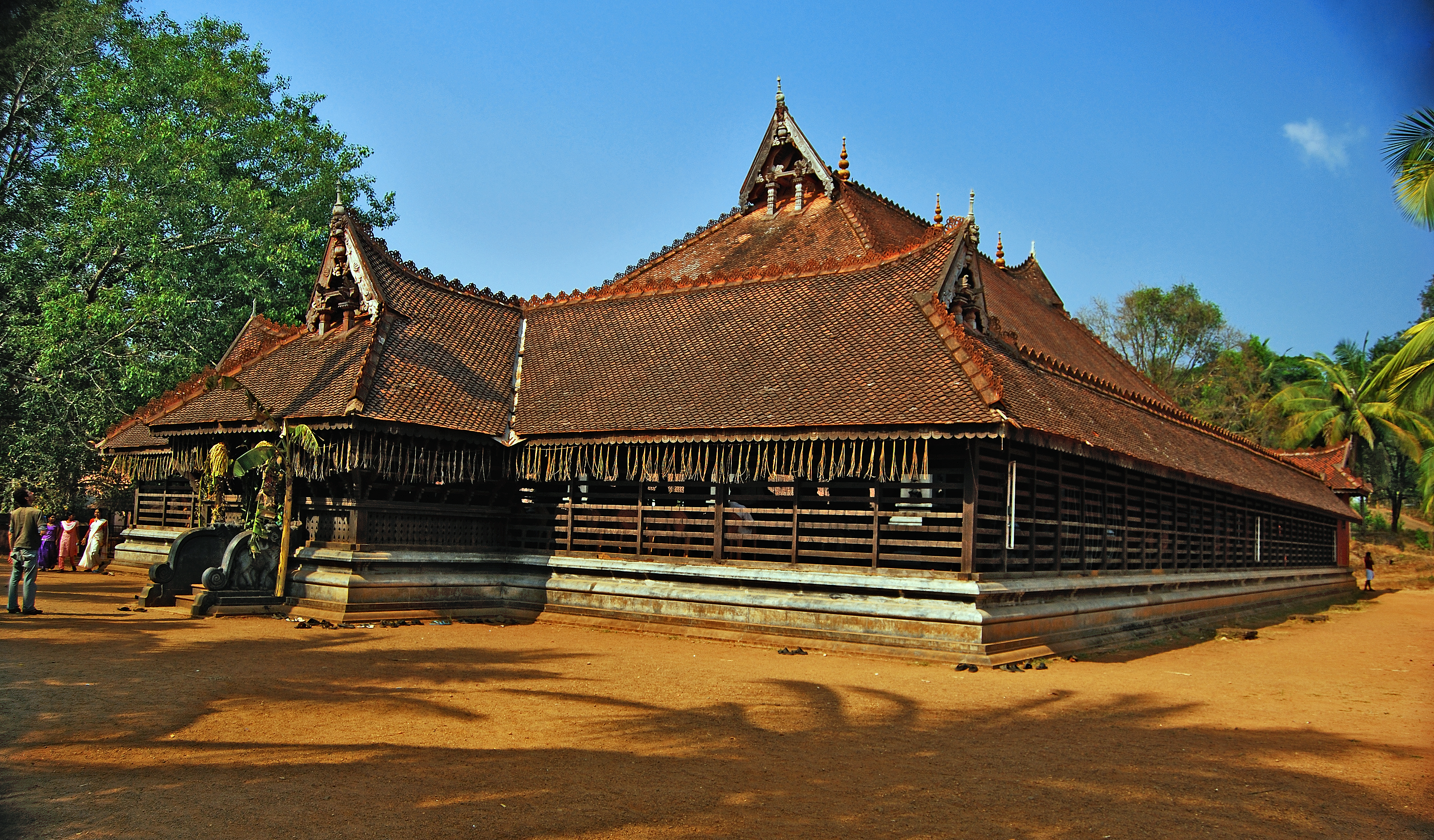
Kerala Kalamandalam is a major centre for Kathakali studies.

Kathakali has traditionally been an art that has continued from one generation to the next through a guru-disciples (gurukkula) based training system. Artist families tended to pick promising talent from within their own extended families, sometimes from outside the family, and the new budding artist typically stayed with his guru as a student and treated like a member of the family. The guru provided both the theoretical and practical training to the student, and the disciple would accompany the guru to formal performances. In modern times, professional schools train students of Kathakali, with some such as those in Trivandrum Margi school emphasizing a single teacher for various courses, while others such as the Kerala Kalamandalam school wherein students learn subjects from different teachers. Kathakali schools are now found all over India, as well as in parts of Western Europe and the United States.

A typical Kathakali training centre auditions for students, examining health and physical fitness necessary for the aerobic and active stage performance, the body flexibility, sense of rhythm and an interview to gauge how sincere the student is in performance arts. A typical course work in Kathakali emphasizes physical conditioning and daily exercises, yoga and body massage to tone the muscles and sculpt the growing body, along with studies and dance practice. Per ancient Indian tradition, young students continue to start their year by giving symbolic gifts to the guru, such as a few coins with betel leaves, while the teacher gives the student a loincloth, a welcome and blessings.

Kathakali is still hugely male-dominated, but since the 1970s, women have made entry into the art form on a recognisable scale. The central Kerala temple town of Tripunithura has a ladies' troupe (Tripunithura Kathakali Kendram Ladies Troupe) who perform Kathakali. The troupe won a national award, i.e. Nari Shakti Puraskar, for their work. (Note: The gender exclusivity is one of the significant differences between Kathakalī and other classical Indian dances which either included or favored female actor-dancers.)

=== Awards for Kathakali artistes ===
- Sangeet Natak Akademi Awardees - Kathakali (1956–2005)
- Nambeesan Smaraka Awards — For artistic performances related kathakali (1992–2008)
- International Centre for Kathakali Award

== Related dance forms ==
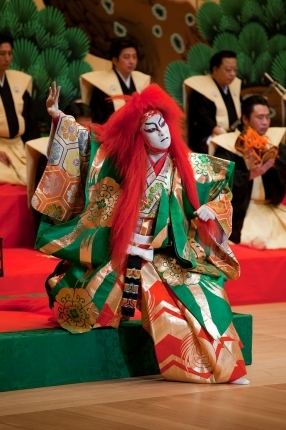
The Japanese performance arts Kabuki/Noh and Chinese performance art Peking Opera are similar in many ways to Kathakali.

The theory and foundations of Kathakali are same as other major classical Indian dances, traceable to Sanskrit texts such as the Natya Shastra, but the expression style in each is very different and distinctive. Kathakali is different from a similar-sounding Kathak, though both are Indian classical dance traditions of "story play" wherein the stories have been traditionally derived from the Hindu epics and the Puranas. Kathak is an ancient performance art that emerged in North India, with roots in traveling bards retelling mythical and spiritual stories through dance-acting. Kathak traditionally has included female actor-dancers, unlike Kathakali which has traditionally been performed by an all-male troupe. Kathak deploys much simpler costumes, makeup and no face masks. Both dance forms employ choreography, face and hand gestures traceable to the Natya Shastra, but Kathak generally moves around a straight leg and torso movements, with no martial art leaps and jumps like Kathakali. Kathak uses the stage space more, and does not typically include separate vocalists. Both deploy a host of similar traditional Indian musical instruments.

Kathakali-style, costume rich, musical drama are found in other cultures. For example, the Japanese Noh (能) integrates masks, costumes and various props in a dance-based performance, requiring highly trained actors and musicians. Emotions are primarily conveyed by stylized gestures while the costumes communicate the nature of the characters in a Noh performance, as in Kathakali. In both, costumed men have traditionally performed all the roles including those of women in the play. The training regimen and initiation of the dance-actors in both cultures have many similarities.

Kabuki, another Japanese art form, has similarities to Kathakali. Jīngjù, a Chinese art of dance-acting (zuo), like Kathakali presents artists with elaborate masks, costumes and colorfully painted faces. Balinese dance as well as tibetan art forms also shares similarities.

== See also ==
- Koodiyattam
- Krishnanattam
- Mohiniyattam
- Chakyar koothu
- Nangiar koothu
- Garudan Thookkam
- Ottan Thullal
- Koothambalam
- Kerala Kalamandalam
- Panchavadyam
- Kabuki
- Peking Opera
- Noh
- Bugaku
- David Bolland

== Sources ==
- Vellinezhi Achuthankutty (2013). Kathakaliyute Kaipusthakam. Thiranottam. ISBN 978-93-5279-490-4.
- Alice Boner (1935), "Kathakali", Journal of the Indian Society of Oriental Art, June 1935, pp 1–14.
- D. Appukuttan Nair, Ayyappa K. Paniker (1993), Kathakali: The Art of the Non-Worldly, Marg Publications, ISBN 978-81-85026-22-0
- Alice Boner (1996). On Kathakali. Alice Boner Foundation.
- Kalamandalam Govindan Kutty (1999). Kathakali, the dance theatre. Asiatic Society.
- Philip Zarrilli (1984). The Kathakali Complex: Performance & Structure. Abhinav Publications. ISBN 978-81-7017-187-4.
- Phillip Zarrilli (2000), Kathakali Dance-Drama: Where Gods and Demons Come to Play, Taylor & Francis, ISBN 978-0-203-19766-0
- Natalia Lidova (2014). Natyashastra. Oxford University Press. doi:10.1093/obo/9780195399318-0071.
- Natalia Lidova (1994). Drama and Ritual of Early Hinduism. Motilal Banarsidass. ISBN 978-81-208-1234-5.
- Williams, Drid (2004). "In the Shadow of Hollywood Orientalism: Authentic East Indian Dancing" (PDF). Visual Anthropology. 17 (1). Routledge: 69–98. doi:10.1080/08949460490274013. S2CID 29065670. Archived from the original (PDF) on 4 March 2016.
- Tarla Mehta (1995). Sanskrit Play Production in Ancient India. Motilal Banarsidass. ISBN 978-81-208-1057-0.
- Emmie Te Nijenhuis (1974). Indian Music: History and Structure. BRILL Academic. ISBN 90-04-03978-3.
- Kapila Vatsyayan (2001). Bharata, the Nāṭyaśāstra. Sahitya Akademi. ISBN 978-81-260-1220-6.
- Kapila Vatsyayan (1977). Classical Indian dance in literature and the arts. Sangeet Natak Akademi. OCLC 233639306., Table of Contents
- Kapila Vatsyayan (1974). Indian classical dance. Sangeet Natak Akademi. OCLC 2238067.
- Kapila Vatsyayan (2008). Aesthetic theories and forms in Indian tradition. Munshiram Manoharlal. ISBN 978-8187586357. OCLC 286469807.
- Kapila Vatsyayan. Dance In Indian Painting. Abhinav Publications. ISBN 978-81-7017-153-9.
- Wallace Dace (1963). "The Concept of "Rasa" in Sanskrit Dramatic Theory". Educational Theatre Journal. 15 (3): 249–254. doi:10.2307/3204783. JSTOR 3204783.
- K.K. Gopalakrishnan (2016). Kathakali Dance-Theatre: A Visual Narrative of Sacred Indian Mime. Niyogi Books. ISBN 9789385285011.
- Leela Venkataraman (2015). Indian Classical Dance: The Renaissance and Beyond. Niyogi Books. ISBN 9789383098644.
- K. P. Padmanabhan Tampy (1963). Kathakali: an indigenous art-form of Kerala. Indian Publications.
