= Theosophical Society Point Loma - Blavatskyhouse =

Theosophical organization

The Theosophical Society Point Loma was based at the Theosophical community of Lomaland in the Point Loma district of San Diego, California from 1900 to 1942, and the international headquarters of a branch of the Theosophical Society from 1900 to 1942. It moved to Covina in Los Angeles County in 1942 and was the branch's international headquarters to 1945, when it moved to Pasadena, California and became the Theosophical Society Pasadena, the branch's current international headquarters.

When the James A. Long was elected president of the Theosophical Society Pasadena, some Theosophical Societies left it to form the Theosophical Society Point Loma-Covina, the present day Theosophical Society Point Loma − Blavatskyhouse The Hague. It has the Dutch Section of The Theosophical Society, which is based at the Blavatsky House in The Hague, the Netherlands. The German Section of The Theosophical Society Point Loma - Blavatskyhouse is based in Berlin.

== History ==
Helena Petrovna Blavatsky founded in 1875 the Theosophical Society in New York. She acted on assignment of her teachers, indicated by the name of 'Masters of Wisdom and Compassion'. With their views they supplied, a foundation was laid to achieve twentieth century thinking. H.P. Blavatsky died in 1891 after many years of self-abnegation, disappointment, revilement and physical suffering. She left a voluminous number of writings behind, of which the theosophical standard work The Secret Doctrine is the most well known.

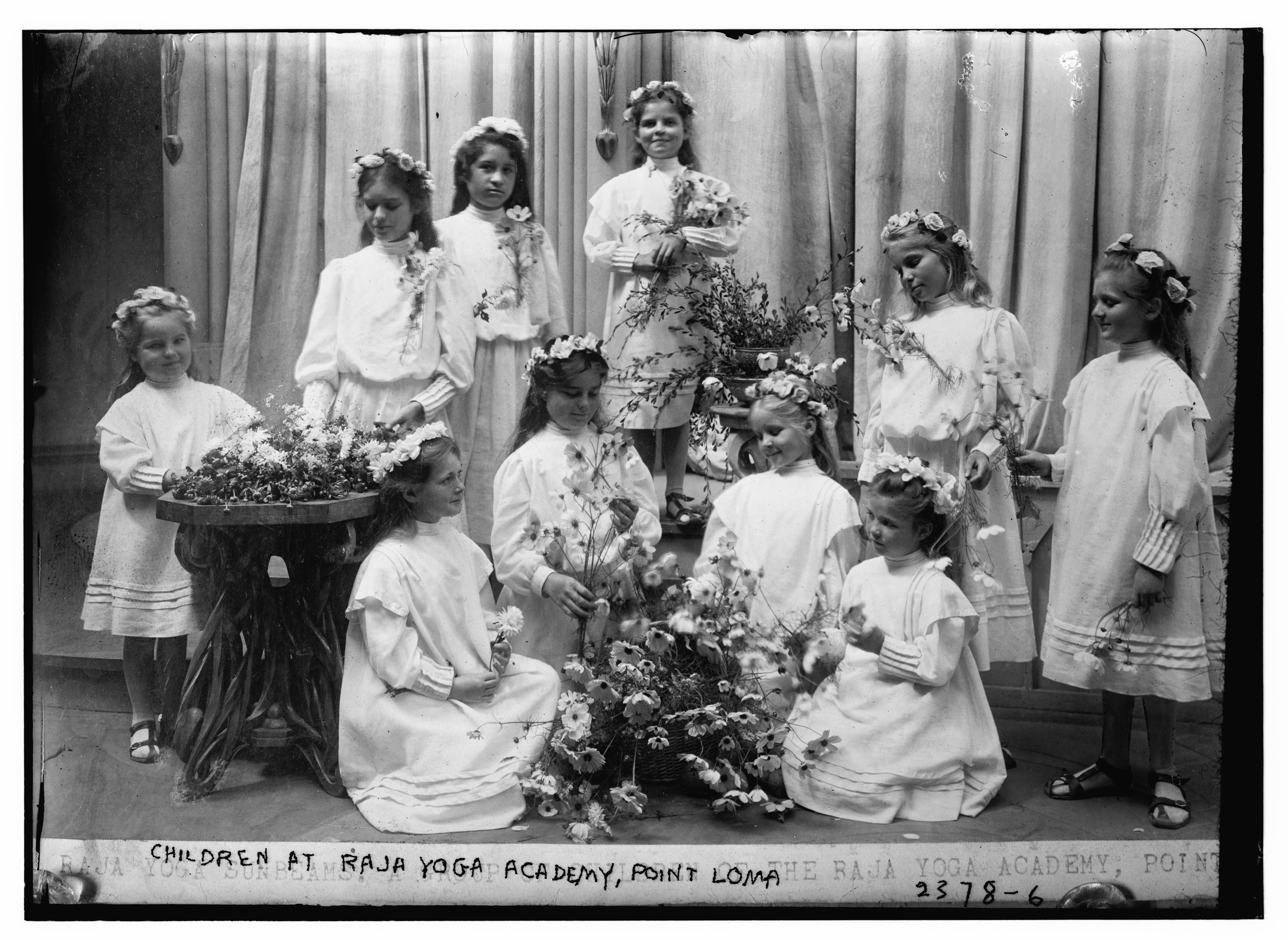
Children at Raja Yoga Academy, Point Loma, c. 1912

=== Branches ===
A number of divisions took place in the Theosophical Society in the course of the years. A few years after the death of H.P. Blavatsky several major branches developed from the original international organization.

1. One branch is known as the Theosophical Society − Point Loma / Blavatsky House, with present-day headquarters at the Blavatsky House in The Hague. After H.P. Blavatsky this branch was directed by W.Q. Judge (1891-1896), Katherine Tingley (1896-1929), Gottfried de Purucker (1929-1942), Arthur L. Conger (1945-1951), W. Hartley (1951-1955), D.J.P. Kok (1958-1985), and H.C. Vermeulen (1985–present).
2. The Theosophical Society Point Loma at Lomaland was founded in 1900, became the Theosophical Society Pasadena in 1945.
3. Founded in 1875 in New York City, one branch is known as the Theosophical Society, with present-day international headquarters in Adyar, India.

=== Organizational framework ===
The organization of the Theosophical Society − Blavatskyhouse The Hague is hierarchically structured. The center is formed by the International Headquarters of the Leader. The organization has national divisions. Every national division forms the coordinating organ of the local lodges.

==== The I.S.I.S. Foundation ====
The acronym I.S.I.S. — of the Theosophical Society—Blavatskyhouse The Hague — stands for International Study centre for Independent Search for truth. The foundation's aim is to form a core of universal brotherhood/sisterhood, by spreading their notions about the spiritual structure of humans and cosmos, free of dogmas. The foundation tries to reach that objective by giving courses, organizing public and other lectures, printing of books, pamphlets and other publications, as well as all its other available means. The foundation does not receive government grants. All activities of the Society and the I.S.I.S. Foundation are carried out on voluntary basis. The organization does not have any paid officials.

=== Goals of the Theosophical Society − Blavatskyhouse The Hague ===
1. To diffuse among people the knowledge of the laws inherent in the Universe.
2. To promulgate the knowledge of the essential unity of all that is, and to demonstrate that this unity is fundamental in nature.
3. To form an active community among humans.
4. To study ancient and modern religion, science, and philosophy.
5. To investigate the powers innate in humans.

== Theosophy ==
Theosophy considers itself as a synthesis of science, philosophy and religion, which are seen as three different ways to investigate and explain life. The name Theosophy stems from the Greek 'Theos' and 'Sophia' meaning wisdom of the gods. However, Theosophy does not want to be a religion but a philosophy of life, which offers the possibility to find a solutions to the problems of life. Theosophy has been called wisdom of the gods because among other things one may find explanations for the motivations of the human soul, its origin, destination, and relation with the cosmos.

The Theosophy, also called Secret Doctrine or Esoteric Philosophy, sets in the first place principles of morality, with directives for the human thinking and acting. This morality is explained in a huge number of teachings about laws in the universe and structures of man and universe.

The Theosophy wants to stimulate independent thinking and the search for truth. Theosophy tries to give explanations as to the how, why and whereto of life and the answer to the question regarding the purpose of life.

The Theosophical Society considers itself as part of a universal, ethical and intellectual movement active throughout the ages, bringing forth, in accordance with the cyclic laws of nature, spiritual impulses, which gave the initial impetus to the great religious and philosophical systems produced by humanity. Sages such like Lao Tze, Krishna, Gautama the Buddha, Jesus the Nazarene, Plato are considered to brought forth these impulses.

=== The Three Fundamental Propositions according to Theosophy ===
1. An omnipresent, eternal, boundless, and immutable principle on which all speculation is impossible, since it transcends the power of human conception and could only be dwarfed by any human expression or similitude. There is one absolute reality which antecedes all manifested, conditioned, being.
2. The eternity of the universe in toto as a boundless plane; periodically "the playground of numberless Universes incessantly manifesting and disappearing", called " the manifesting stars", and the "sparks of eternity".
3. The fundamental identity of all souls with the universal over-soul, the latter being itself an aspect of the unknown root; and the obligatory pilgrimage for every soul - a spark of the former - through a cycle of incarnation (or "necessity" ) in accordance with cyclic and Karmic law, during the whole term.

=== The basis of Theosophy ===
Theosophy does not consider itself to depart from a highest god, who has created the universe out of nothing and supplies the soul to the human being. Theosophy assumes that the universe developed in a mechanical way out of primordial matter, in which life is the consequence of the processes in matter and external influences.

Opposite to this is the fundamental thought of Theosophy:

- Life or consciousness is the cause of all that exists.
- This basic thought stems from the assumption that there is one omnipresent, eternal, boundless and immutable principle, which transcends the power of human conception and can only be dwarfed by any human expression or similitude.
- This principle of life is the causeless cause of all manifested conditioned being. It is neither a god nor a force.

=== The consequences of Theosophy for human life ===
Theosophy assumes an essential unity behind the variety of forms and expressions of life; this unity is the basis of the entire Nature. Therefore Theosophy teaches universal brotherhood of all beings as a fact of nature. This thought of brotherhood is not based upon sentiment, but upon the assumed structure of the universe, where everything is inextricably interconnected and cooperating with one and another. From this Theosophy infers the explanation of the principles of morality for the daily walk of life which are charity, compassion, cooperation and brotherhood without any discrimination of color, race, nationality, social status or religious conviction.

Theosophy teaches that all what lives does so according to universal laws. One of these laws is re-embodiment, which means that humans will be born over and over again. In conjunction with this is the law of cause and effect, which points to strict justice in the universe, in which there is no room for chance, good- and/or tough luck. Theosophy teaches that the character of any human being and the conditions under which he or she lives are natural consequences of one's own actions and thinking in past lives.

Theosophy assumes that humans govern their own destiny, meaning that every human being is capable, if so desiring, to change their own life and character and earns their own bliss; the path shown to that end is the ideal of a "human brotherhood/sisterhood" by exercising the principles of the morality in daily life.

== See also ==
- Theosophical Society Pasadena
