= Grace F. Knoche =

- Predecessor: James A. Long
- Successor: Randell Grubb

Grace F. Knoche (February 15, 1909 – February 18, 2006) was leader of the Theosophical Society with international headquarters at Pasadena, California from 1971. The Society was founded in 1875 in New York City to promote universal brotherhood, the study of philosophy, religion, and science, and to investigate the powers innate in nature and man.

Knoche was born at Society's headquarters, then at Point Loma, California, and educated at its schools which pioneered a rounded curriculum including art, music, and drama, completing her education at Theosophical University (PhD 1944). In the 1930s and 1940s she worked at the headquarters in several capacities including the secretarial and editorial staffs. At various times from 1933 to 1946 she also taught violin, Greek, Hebrew, Sanskrit, Bible translation, and Qabbalah at Theosophical University, as well as sculpture and painting at the Lomaland School. After Colonel Arthur L. Conger became leader of the Society in 1945, Knoche became his private secretary and subeditor of The Theosophical Forum. On Conger's death in 1951, she continued as private secretary to the next leader, James A. Long, and was subeditor of Sunrise magazine until his death in 1971.

As leader, Knoche emphasized theosophy as a practical and compassionate way of living, believing that "mankind is a living brotherhood of human souls, and how and what any one person thinks or does has its inevitable effect on the totality of world thought." She encouraged mutual respect and cooperation among the members of various theosophical organizations, while recognizing the value of each organization as an independent entity. She put special emphasis on the publications program, in print and online, making the full text of virtually all the Society's press publications freely available on the internet. Besides scores of articles in theosophical magazines, especially Sunrise: Theosophic Perspectives, she wrote three books: To Light a Thousand Lamps, The Mystery Schools, and Theosophy in the Qabbalah (unpublished).

== Works ==
- The Mystery Schools. Theosophical University Press, Pasadena, 1999; ISBN 1-55700-066-2
- To Light a Thousand Lamps: A Theosophic Vision. Theosophical University Press, Pasadena, 2001; ISBN 1-55700-171-5

== Sources ==
- obituary of Grace Knoche
