= Theosophical Society Pasadena =

Branch of Theosophy

The Theosophical Society (Pasadena) is a branch of Theosophy based in Pasadena, California. It claims to be the successor organization to the original Theosophical Society founded by Helena Petrovna Blavatsky and others in 1875 in New York City. It is the second largest Theosophical group in members and international reach after the Theosophical Society Adyar.

== History ==
It traces its roots to the line of William Quan Judge established Leader in 1895 was recognized by a portion of The Society after Blavatsky's death due to a dispute surrounding Annie Besant regarding the existence of The Masters. The juxtaposed positions are put as this: he was either "faithful to the teachings of the Mahatmas" (the stance of the modern Pasadena organization) or as Besant claimed, had forged the letters claiming them to be from the Mahatmas (the stance of the modern Adyar organization). The corresponding faction led by Henry Steel Olcott and Annie Besant, whose organization, based in India, is known today as the Theosophical Society - Adyar.

Judge led the American group for nearly a year prior to his sudden death in 1896 while traveling across India, at which time Katherine Tingley became Leader. Although initially supported by Ernest Temple Hargorve, he and a group of roughly 200 members disputed Tingley's leadership chose to secede and formed a new faction of the Brotherhood, dubbed the Theosophical Society in America (Hargrove). In 1900 Tingley moved the Theosophical Society's headquarters from New York City to Lomaland at Point Loma, San Diego located in Southern California. It later moved to Covina in Los Angeles County in 1942, and finally found a home in Altadena, California in 1945.

Max Heindel was vice president during 1904 and 1905. Leaders of The Theosophical Society Pasadena have included Gottfried de Purucker, 1929–42; Arthur L. Conger, 1945–51; James A. Long (1951–1971); Grace Knoche (1971–2006); and Randell Grubb (since 2006).

The Theosophical Society of Pasadena devote the majority of their time in the furthering of the realization of the Divine Wisdom, making available the majority of Theosophical texts available online via their online location.

In January 2025, the Theosophical Library Center in Pasadena was destroyed in the Eaton Fire.

== See also ==
- Theosophical Society topics
- Halcyon, California — The Temple of the People.
- Theosophical Society Point Loma - Blavatskyhouse
- United Lodge of Theosophists

== External references ==
- Theosophical Society (Pasadena) - official website
- Greenwalt, Emmett A. (1978). California Utopia: Point Loma, 1897 to 1942. San Diego: Point Loma Publications. ISBN 0-913004-31-6.
