= Arthur L. Conger =

U.S. Army officer and author

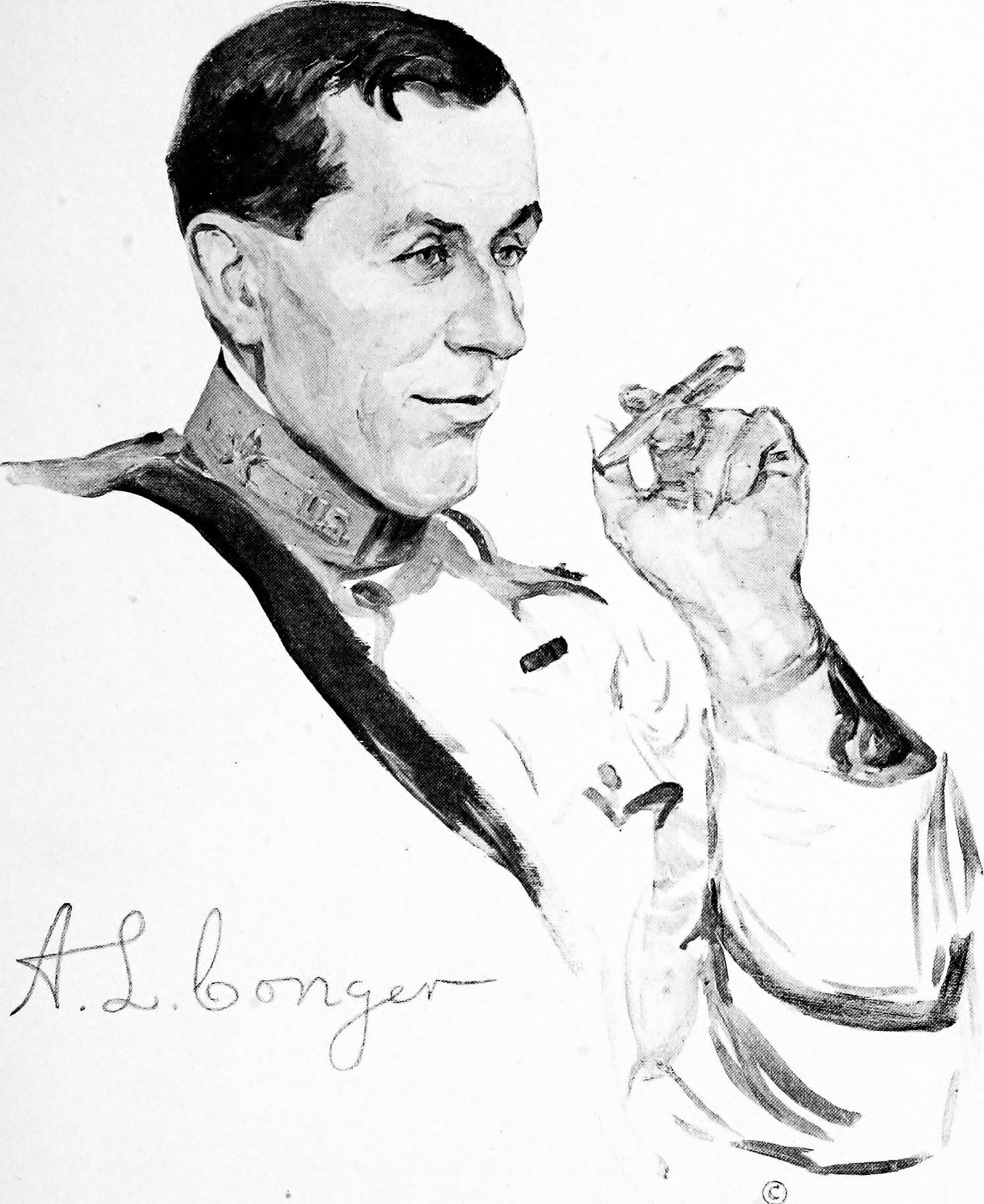
- From 1920's Soldiers all; portraits and sketches of the men of the A. E. F.
- Born: January 30, 1872; Akron, Ohio
- Died: February 22, 1951 (aged 79); Pasadena, California
- Education: Harvard College (A.B., 1894)
- Spouse(s): Margaret Loring Guild (m. 1902–1945, her death); Martha R. Franklin (m. 1950–1951, his death)
- Military career
- Allegiance: United States
- Branch: United States Army
- Service years: 1898–1928
- Rank: Colonel
- Unit: U.S. Army Infantry Branch
- Commands: 56th Infantry Brigade; 20th Infantry Regiment
- Conflicts: Spanish–American War; Philippine–American War; Boxer Rebellion; Pancho Villa Expedition; World War I
- Awards: Army Distinguished Service Medal; Silver Star; Legion of Honor (Officer) (France); Croix de Guerre (France); Order of St Michael and St George (Great Britain)
- Other work: Author; President, Theosophical Society Pasadena

Arthur Latham Conger Jr. (January 30, 1872 – February 22, 1951) was an officer in the United States Army, a writer and editor. A veteran of the Spanish–American War, Philippine–American War, Boxer Rebellion, Pancho Villa Expedition, and World War I, he attained the rank of colonel and devised the World War I deception known as the Belfort Ruse. A noted theosophist, he served as president of Theosophical Society Pasadena.

A native of Akron, Ohio, Conger attended Harvard College and the Episcopal Theological Seminary, then worked at the Theosophy Society's main office in New York City. He joined the Army during the Spanish–American War, and served in the Philippines. He continued to serve in the Philippines during the Philippine–American War, and was part of the American contingent that took part in responding to China's Boxer Rebellion. He served on the U.S.-Mexico border during the Pancho Villa Expedition.

During World War I, Conger served as assistant chief of staff for Intelligence (G-2) on the staff of the 2nd Division, and then as a member of the Intelligence directorate (G-2) on the staff of the American Expeditionary Forces headquarters. While on the AEF staff, Conger was the lead planner for a summer 1918 deception, which became known as the Belfort Ruse. This effort to deceive German commanders into allocating forces away from Saint-Mihiel was intended to produce an Allied advantage during an upcoming offensive. At the ensuing Battle of Saint-Mihiel, the Allied numerical superiority produced by Conger's deception surprised the Germans and caused a rapid Allied victory. After this success, Conger was assigned to command the 56th Infantry Brigade, which he led until the end of the war.

After World War I, Conger commanded the 20th Infantry Regiment and served as U.S. military attaché in Berlin, Germany and Bern, Switzerland. He retired in 1928. After leaving the military, Conger renewed his interest in theosophy. In 1945 he was elected president of Theosophical Society Pasadena, and he served until his death. He died in Pasadena, California on February 22, 1951.

== Early life ==
Arthur L. Conger Jr., was born in Akron, Ohio, on January 30, 1872. He was the second of four children born to Arthur L. Conger Sr. and Emily (Bronson) Conger. The senior Conger was a Union Army veteran of the American Civil War, member of the Ohio National Guard, prominent businessman, and Republican Party leader. He was also a high-ranking Mason, and attained the Knight Templar degree of the York Rite and 32nd degree of the Scottish Rite. Emily Conger was prominent in the Daughters of the American Revolution, Order of the Eastern Star, and Women's Relief Corps. She was the author of An Ohio Woman in the Philippines, and in 1903 became qualified as a doctor of osteopathic medicine.

The younger Conger was nicknamed "Whit" because as a boy he was often found whittling with a pocket knife, and he was educated in the public schools of Akron. When Conger was 13, his older brother Kenyon sustained severe injuries in a bicycle accident. His doctor recommended foreign travel as part of his treatment, so Kenyon Conger, Arthur Conger and another companion spent a year visiting the British Isles, Continental Europe, the Mediterranean coast, and the Near East.

As a youth, Conger began the study of music. He became an accomplished piano and organ player, and frequently gave concerts, played at church services, and participated in entertainment programs. He continued to study music and music composition throughout his life, and maintained a lifelong interest in the piano and organ.

In 1890, Conger began attendance at Harvard College, where he was a member of the fencing team, chess club, whist club, Hasty Pudding Institute of 1770, and Delta Kappa Epsilon fraternity. Conger left college without graduating; he later completed his graduation requirements, and in 1908 Harvard awarded him an A.B. degree as a member of the class of 1894. While at Harvard, Conger was introduced to theosophy, and he became a member of the Theosophical Society on June 16, 1892.

== Start of career ==
Prior to attending college, Conger had declined his father's request to join the senior Conger in the publishing business. After leaving college, Conger agreed to his parents' request that he attend the Episcopal Theological Seminary and consider becoming a member of the clergy. He attended for two years before informing his parents that his views had not changed, and he was committed to theosophy. After leaving the seminary, Conger moved to New York City to perform volunteer work at the Theosophy Society's general offices. He quickly made a favorable impression, and was soon working as leader Katherine Tingley's secretary. When the society founded the International Brotherhood League in 1897 to perform nonsectarian social work among convicts and the urban poor, Conger was elected the league's secretary.

In April 1898, Conger's family cut him off financially as a result of his continuing commitment to theosophy. To support himself, Conger enlisted in the United States Army. Joining Company "M", 12th New York Infantry, United States Volunteers as a corporal, Conger took part in the Spanish–American War and soon earned promotion to sergeant. Later that year, Conger's application for a regular army commission was approved and he was appointed a second lieutenant in the 18th Infantry Regiment. In 1899, he was promoted to first lieutenant in the 4th Infantry, and he was subsequently transferred back to the 18th Infantry. Conger took part in combat in Cuba and the Philippines during both the Spanish–American War and Philippine–American War, and received a brevet promotion to captain in 1900 to recognize his heroism during the Panay campaign. Conger was later accused in the November 1900 water cure torturing of two Filipino local officials. His superior officer, Edwin Forbes Glenn was convicted at court-martial, but Glenn's subordinates, including Conger, were not charged.

== Military historian ==
From 1901 to 1903, Conger served in the Philippines as aide-de-camp to Major General Robert Patterson Hughes. In addition, he was part of the U.S. contingent that served in China during the American response to the Boxer Rebellion. In 1905, he was promoted to captain in the 29th Infantry and graduated from the Army's Infantry and Cavalry School. He was also a 1906 graduate of the United States Army Command and General Staff College.

After graduating from the staff college, Conger became a member of the faculty, and taught from 1907 to 1910 and 1913 to 1916. In the interregnum, Conger studied German military history at Berlin University and Heidelberg University, where Hans Delbrück taught Conger his critical examination method. He then served with the 29th Infantry at Fort Niagara, New York.

As an instructor, Conger required students to conduct independent research on military events including the American Civil War's 1862 Peninsular campaign. Using original sources from the Fort Leavenworth post library, students researched topics of interest, then prepared and presented papers. Conger's innovations added depth to the curriculum, and provided students with lessons learned that they could apply in similar situations in the future.

Conger was promoted to major in 1915 and later that year he conducted a seminar on military history at Harvard University. In 1916, he co-founded and became editor of a quarterly magazine, The Military Historian & Economist. During the Pancho Villa Expedition, Conger served on the U.S.-Mexico border as a member of the 26th Infantry Regiment.

== World War I ==
At the start of World War I, Conger was promoted to temporary lieutenant colonel and assigned as assistant chief of staff for Intelligence (G-2) on the staff of the 2nd Division. Later assigned to the Intelligence directorate (G-2) on the staff of the American Expeditionary Forces headquarters, Conger was the chief planner of a military deception effort that became known as the Belfort Ruse. This deception, which attempted to convince German commander Erich Ludendorff that the American First Army would go on the offensive at Belfort rather than at Saint-Mihiel in the fall of 1918, was intended to cause Ludendorff to allocate forces away from First Army's attack. Uncertain of which area was the real location of the planned offensive, Ludendorff held forces in reserve, positioned to move to either Saint-Mihiel or Belfort. As a result, First Army had numerical superiority and the advantage of surprise when it commenced the Battle of Saint-Mihiel, which produced an American victory and the capture or flight of Ludendorff's reserves.

After promotion to temporary colonel, Conger commanded the 56th Infantry Brigade. He led this command from the Meuse–Argonne offensive until the end of the war.

== Post-World War I ==
Following the war, Conger served on the Command and General Staff College faculty. He then attended the United States Army War College, from which he graduated in 1920. He was promoted to permanent lieutenant colonel on July 1, 1920, and permanent colonel on April 27, 1921. From 1921 to 1923, he commanded the 20th Infantry Regiment at Fort Sam Houston, Texas. In 1924, Conger was assigned as a U.S. military attaché, and he served in Berlin, Germany and Bern, Switzerland.

While serving in Berlin, Conger was permitted to attend a senior German military officers' course on the condition that he not reveal any details about the school or its curriculum. He retired from the military on October 31, 1928.

== Later life ==
In the early 1920s, Conger began to rekindle his Theosophical Society activities. In 1932, he became president of the society's American Section. He resigned in 1933 because he was struggling with the effects of Parkinson's disease, but resumed the post in 1939. In 1945, he was elected head of the Theosophical Society. He served until his death, and his leadership tenure was notable for the move of the society's headquarters from Covina, California to nearby Pasadena. Conger died in Pasadena on February 22, 1951.

== Family ==
On February 8, 1902, Conger married Margaret Loring Guild. Also active in the Theosophical Society, she was the compiler of the Combined Chronology, a work intended as a companion to The Mahatma Letters to A.P. Sinnett and The Letters of H. P. Blavatsky to A. P. Sinnett. Margaret Conger died in 1945, and in 1950 Conger married Martha Franklin (1878–1959).

== Awards ==
Conger received the Silver Citation Star to recognize his heroism during the Philippine–American War, which was later converted to the Silver Star. His World War I service was recognized with award of the Army Distinguished Service Medal, French Legion of Honor (Officer) and Croix de Guerre, and British Order of St Michael and St George (Companion).

=== Army Distinguished Service Medal citation ===
"The President of the United States of America, authorized by Act of Congress, July 9, 1918, takes pleasure in presenting the Army Distinguished Service Medal to Colonel (Infantry) Arthur L. Conger, United States Army, for exceptionally meritorious and distinguished services to the Government of the United States, in a duty of great responsibility during World War I. As a member of the Second Section, General Staff, General Headquarters, Colonel Conger's marked professional attainments, his zeal, and his sound judgment contributed largely to the successful operations of his section. As Chief the Second Section, General Staff, of the 2d Division, during active operations, and later as Commander of a brigade of the 28th Division during the Argonne-Meuse offensive, he demonstrated his great energy and his clear conception of tactics."

Service: Army Rank: Colonel Division: General Staff, 2d Division, American Expeditionary Forces General Orders: War Department, General Orders No. 35 (1920)

== Published works ==
=== As author ===
- The Function of Military History Mississippi Valley Historical Review, 1916.
- President Lincoln As War Statesman. State Historical Society of Wisconsin, 1916.
- The Military Education of Grant As General. Menasha, 1921.
- The Rise of U.S. Grant. The Century Co., 1931.
- "The Military Education of Grant as General." Wisconsin Magazine of History (1921): 239–262. online

=== As editor ===
- Judge, William Quan: Practical Occultism: From the Private Letters of William Q. Judge. Theosophical University Press, Pasadena 1951
- Purucker, Gottfried de: The Dialogues of G. de Purucker: Report of Sessions. Theosophical University Press, Covina 1948
