= List of theosophical glossaries =

This is a list of theosophical glossaries. Some important theosophical glossaries are the Theosophical Glossary by Helena Blavatsky, first published in 1892; the Encyclopedic Theosophical Glossary by Gottfried de Purucker; and the Collation of Theosophical Glossaries.

== List of some other theosophical glossaries ==
- EG | Encyclopedic Theosophical Glossary - 1999 | G. de Purucker, ed.
- FY | Five Years of Theosophy - 1885 | H. P. Blavatsky, ed.
- GH | Gods and Heroes of the Bhagavad Gita - 1939 | Geoffrey A. Barborka
- IN | An Invitation to the Secret Doctrine - 1988 | Grace F. Knoche, ed.
- IU | Isis Unveiled - 1877 | H. P. Blavatsky
- KT | Key to Theosophy - 1889 | H. P. Blavatsky
- MO | The Masks of Odin - 1985 | Elsa-Brita Titchenell
- OG | Occult Glossary - 1933, 1996 | G. de Purucker
- PV | Esotericism of the Popol Vuh | Raphael Girard (glossary by Blair A. Moffett)
- SD INDEX | Index to The Secret Doctrine - 1997 | John P. Van Mater
- SF | Search and Find - 1978 | Elsie Benjamin
- SK | Sanskrit Keys the Wisdom Religion - 1940 | Judith Tyberg
  - SKf | Sanskrit terms from Fundamentals of the Esoteric Philosophy, by G. de Purucker, 1932.
  - SKo | Sanskrit terms from The Ocean of Theosophy, by William Q. Judge, 1893.
  - SKs | Sanskrit terms from The Secret Doctrine, by H. P. Blavatsky, 1888.
  - SKv | Sanskrit terms from The Voice of the Silence, by H. P. Blavatsky, 1889.
- SP | Sanskrit Pronunciation - 1992 | Bruce Cameron Hall
- TG | Theosophical Glossary - 1892 | H. P. Blavatsky
- VS | Voice of the Silence - 1889 | H. P. Blavatsky
- WG | The Working Glossary - 1892 | W. Q. Judge
  - WGa | Terms from The Working Glossary Appendix
- WW | Word Wisdom in the Esoteric Tradition - 1980 | G. de Purucker
