= Sibyl Anikeef =

American photographer (1896–1997)

- Born: Marie Augusta Phillipson; March 29, 1896; Chicago, Illinois, U.S.
- Died: July 27, 1997 (aged 101); New York City, U.S.
- Other names: Marie Augusta Phillipsohn, Sibyl Brainerd, Sibyl Anikeyev, Sibyl Aniekeff, Sibyl Anikeef Freed, Sibyl Brainerd Freed, Sibyl Freed
- Occupation: Photographer
- Spouses: Anikeef (or Anikeyev), Simon Freed
- Children: 1

Sibyl Anikeef (née Marie Augusta Phillipson; March 29, 1896 – July 27, 1997) was an American photographer. She worked for the Federal Art Project, and lived variously in New York City, San Diego, Chicago, Carmel by the Sea, San Francisco, and Los Angeles. She is best known for her portrayal of the Monterey Peninsula and portraits of fisherman, still lives, and landscapes. She used various names including Sibyl Brainerd, and Sibyl Brainerd Freed.

== Biography ==
She was born as Marie Augusta Phillipson on March 29, 1896, in Chicago, Illinois, to parents Belle Brainerd from Colorado, and Emil Phillipson (or alternate spelling Phillipsohn) from Germany. In her early childhood she was raised in Brooklyn, New York. Her mother died in 1905, and she and her siblings were raised by her maternal grandparents Wesley and Marie Brainerd in Lomaland, a theosophical community in Point Loma, San Diego, California. The children studied at Madame Tingley’s Theosophical Institute. Their grandparents died in 1908 and 1910, and afterwards she changed her name to "Sibyl Brainerd" to honor them. Their maternal grandmother's brother Lyman Judson Gage moved to Lomaland and took care of the children after their grandparents died.

Anikeef was a photographer for the Federal Art Project, and through that experience she met photographer Edward Weston. He later became her lifelong friend, and someone she both models for and served as her model. Photography containing her as a model (by Weston) can be found in the museum collections at Syracuse University Art Museum, Museum of Fine Arts, Boston, and the Metropolitan Museum of Art.

She died on July 27, 1997, in New York City. Her own photography work can be found in the museum and library collections at the Museum of Modern Art, the Nelson-Atkins Museum of Art, the library special collections at University of California, Davis, and the San Francisco Museum of Modern Art.

== Personal life ==
On October 21, 1921, she married her first husband in New York City, Vasile Anikeef (or alternate spelling Anikeyev) an opera singer from Russia. Together they had one son, Lyman, born in Moscow in 1927.

Her second husband was Simon Freed, an atomic scientist, they were married on May 5, 1943, in Chicago.
