= Theosophical Library Center =

The Theosophical Library Center was located at 2416 North Lake Avenue in Altadena, California. It was destroyed in the January 2025 Eaton Fire. Founded in 1951 upon the relocation of the Theosophical Society's headquarters (see Theosophical Society Pasadena), it was purported to be the world's largest archive of Theosophical materials with over 40,000 library titles, an art gallery, and a detailed account of membership records dating back to 1875.

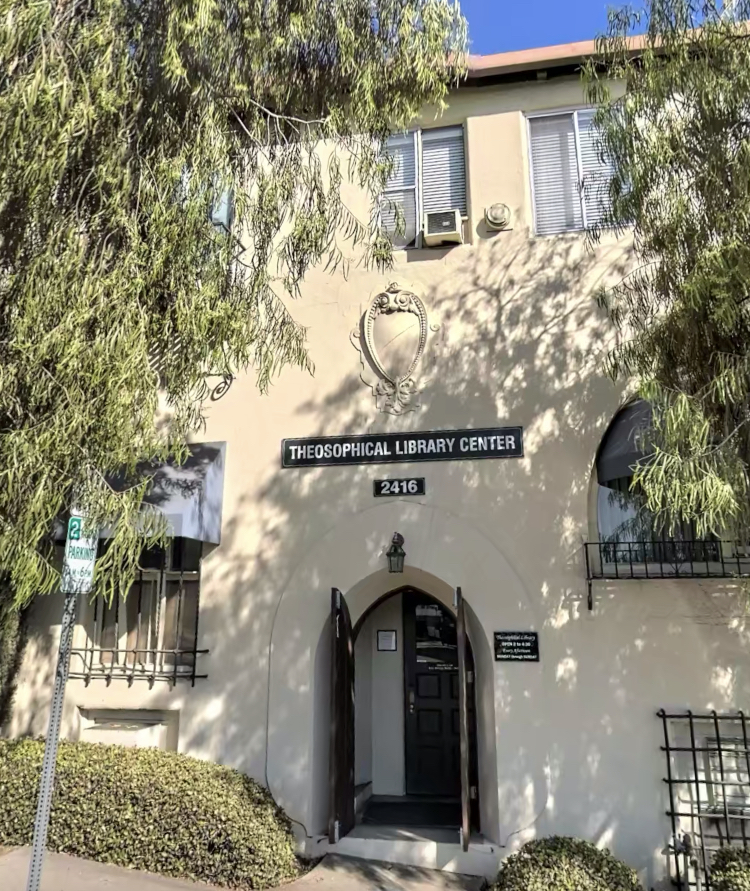
