= Edwin Forbes Glenn =

United States Army general

Edwin Glenn
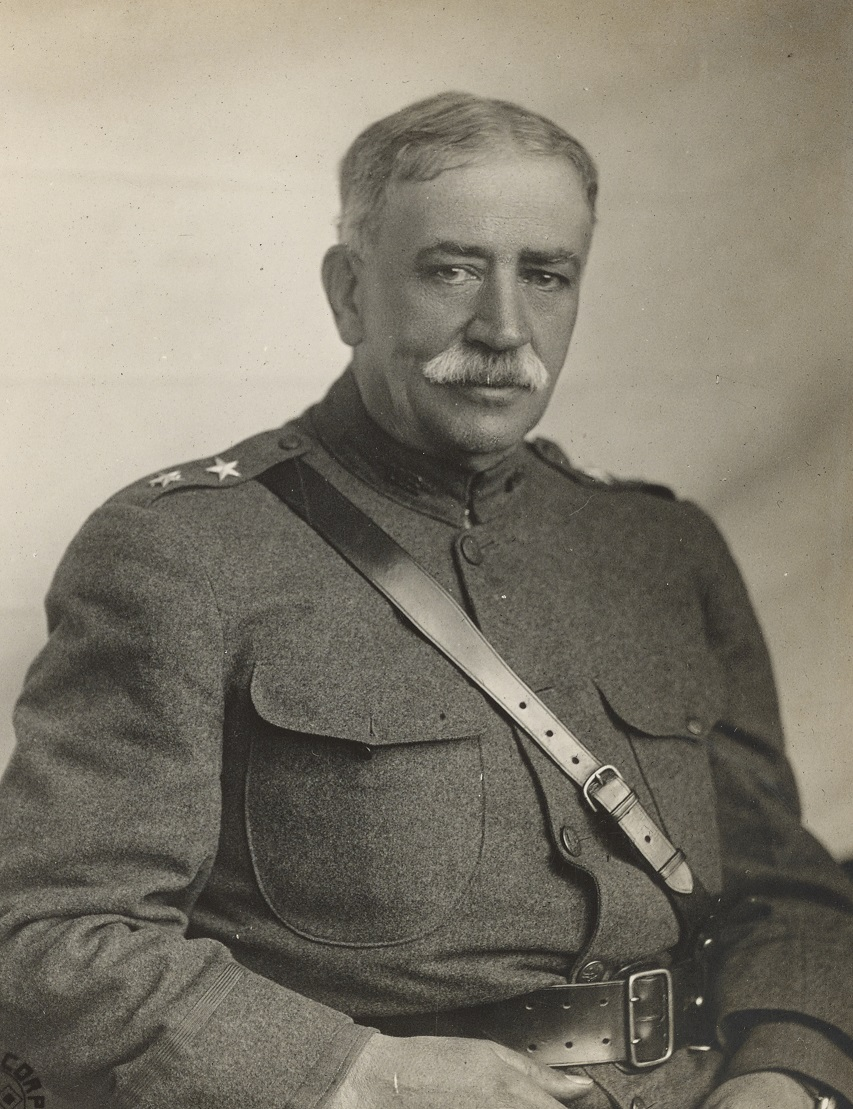
- Major general Glenn as commander of the 83rd division, Langres, June 1918
- Born: January 10, 1857; Greensboro, North Carolina
- Died: August 5, 1926 (aged 69); Glendon, Moore County, North Carolina
- Spouse: Louise Smythe
- Military career
- Allegiance: United States
- Branch: United States Army
- Service years: 1877–1919
- Rank: Major General
- Service number: 0-13126
- Conflicts: American Indian Wars; Spanish–American War; Philippine–American War; World War I

Edwin Forbes Glenn (Note: His middle name appears in some records as "Forbis".) (January 10, 1857 – August 5, 1926) was a United States Army officer in the late 19th and early 20th centuries. He served in World War I among other capacities.

== Biography ==
Glenn was born near Greensboro, North Carolina, on January 10, 1857. After attending a private boys school in North Carolina and a preparatory school in New York, he entered the United States Military Academy, graduating in 1877.

Glenn was commissioned into the 25th Infantry Regiment, and he did frontier duty from 1877 to 1888. In 1888, he joined the University of Minnesota, working as its first professor of Military Science and Tactics in addition to teaching mathematics. During this time, Glenn studied law and received a degree, joining the Minnesota Bar. He served as the judge advocate of the Department of the Dakota and later of the Department of the Columbia. Starting in 1898, he commanded military expeditions in the District of Alaska, and was among the first non-natives to cross Isabel Pass. Once his exploration missions ceased, he became a judge advocate in the Philippines in 1900. While in the Philippines, he and his subordinates, including Arthur L. Conger, were accused of subjecting Filipinos to torture by water cure; Glenn was convicted at court-martial and sentenced to suspension from command for a month and a fine of fifty dollars. The other soldiers under Glenn's command were not charged. Glenn commanded the Columbus Barracks from 1905 to 1907, and he subsequently returned to the Philippines with the 32nd Infantry Regiment, remaining there until 1913. Glenn entered the United States Army War College in 1913, and after he graduated, he became the Chief of Staff of the Department of the East. From 1916 to 1917, he commanded the 18th Infantry Regiment and the First Separate Brigade at Camp Cody.

Glenn was promoted to the rank of brigadier general on May 15, 1917, and subsequently to major general on August 5, 1917, and he subsequently organized and commanded the 83rd Infantry Division, commanding it from August 25, 1917, to January 13, 1918. He received the Legion of Honour. During demobilization in 1919, Glenn commanded Camp Sherman in Ohio. He retired as a brigadier general in December 1919.

In addition to his military service, Glenn served as "one of the earlier presidents" of the predecessor of the Association of the United States Army, serving from 1913 to 1920. He also wrote two books, the first being Glenn's International Law in 1895 and the second being Rules of Land Warfare in 1914.

In retirement, Glenn lived in Glendon, in Moore County, North Carolina. He died on August 5, 1926. Congress restored his rank of major general in June 1930.

== Personal life ==
In 1886, Glenn married Louise Smythe of Saint Paul, Minnesota. They were the parents of three daughters: Louise (Mrs. Otis R. Cole); Edwina (Mrs. James A. Garfield); (Note: James A. Garfield (1894–1969) was the son of James Rudolph Garfield and grandson of President James A. Garfield.) and Elizabeth (Mrs. Harold R. Tyler).

== Bibliography ==
- Davis, Henry Blaine Jr. (1998). Generals in Khaki. Raleigh, North Carolina: Pentland Press. ISBN 1571970886. OCLC 40298151.
- Marquis Who's Who (1975). Who Was Who In American History – The Military. Chicago, Illinois: Marquis Who's Who. ISBN 0837932017.
