= Lomaland =

Theosophical community in California, United States of America

Coordinates: 32.716853°N 117.250686°W

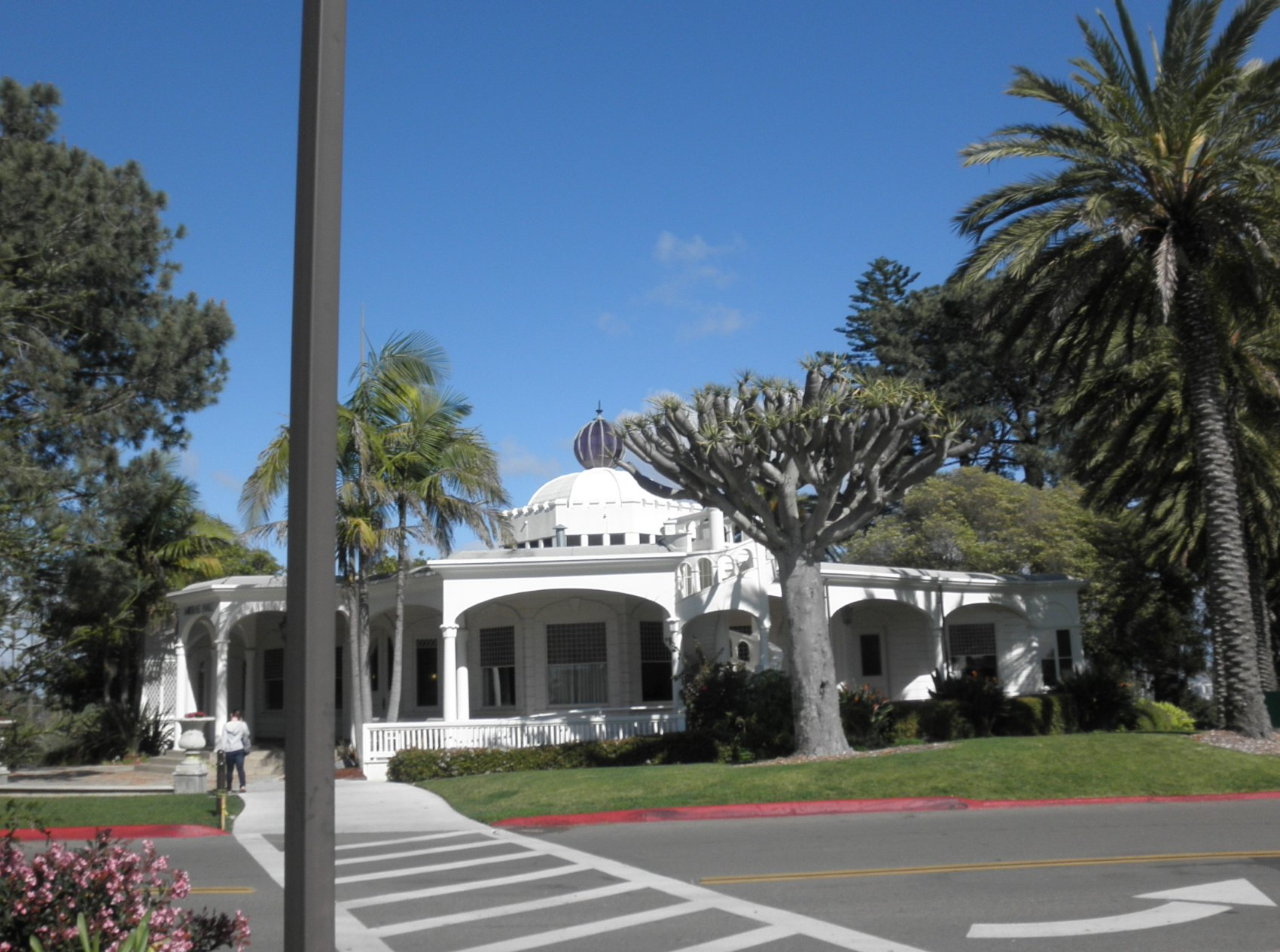
Mieras Hall, now the administration building on the Point Loma Nazarene University campus; originally the home of Albert Spalding.

Lomaland was a Theosophical community in Point Loma in San Diego, California, from 1900 to 1942. Theosophical Society leader Katherine Tingley founded it in 1900 as a school, cultural center, and residential facility for her followers. The American headquarters of the Theosophical Society Pasadena was also situated there. The facility was important to the growing city of San Diego for its cultural offerings, and it left a lasting legacy in its campus (now Point Loma Nazarene University) which still retains many of the unique architectural features of the original Lomaland. The residents of Lomaland also transformed their Point Loma neighborhood by planting so many trees, orchards and shrubs that the formerly barren neighborhood is now known as the "Wooded Area".

Led by Katherine Tingley, the group came to Point Loma to establish a community that would model the philosophical and humanitarian goals of Theosophy. The "White City" envisioned by Tingley was to be located on the extreme western edge of the North American continent but oriented toward India, the spiritual center of Theosophical beliefs. The blend of new world confidence, Victorian morality, a love of antiquity, and Indian spirituality created a unique community that found its expression in architecture that is still visible on the campus of Point Loma Nazarene University.

== History of the Point Loma site ==
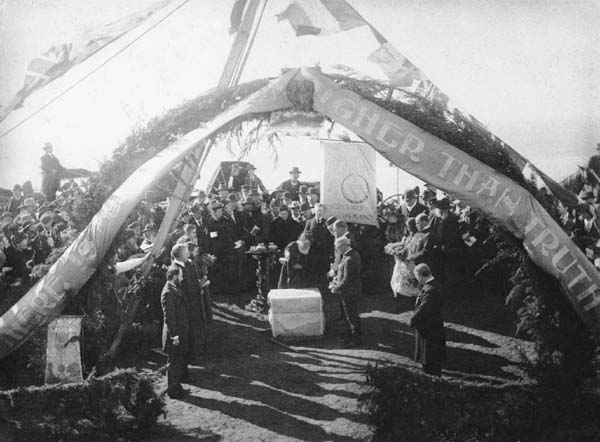
Laying of the cornerstone, February 23, 1897

Gottfried de Purucker visited Point Loma in 1894, and in 1896 he met Katherine Tingley in Geneva where he spoke about the place. In 1897 Tingley bought a piece of land at Point Loma, and in February 1897 she laid the first stone for a School for the Revival of the Lost Mysteries of Antiquity (SRLMA). In 1899 Tingley moved to Lomaland, and in 1900 Universal Brotherhood and Theosophical Society (UBTS) also established their headquarters there. Agricultural experimentation was essential to the Lomaland community's desire to be self-sufficient in all respects, and the group imported and tried many different types of plants and trees including avocados, oranges, and other fruit. Katherine Tingley's goal was to serve fresh fruits and vegetables at Lomaland every day of the year.

In summer 1900, the educational arm of Lomaland, a Raja yoga school, was opened up. In 1901 followed an open air Greek theatre, a temple, in 1914 a college, and by 1919 a theosophical university. Many other buildings were established including a hotel, a theatre, a textile factory, a joinery, a bakery, a publishing house, and more. Vegetable and fruit gardens were planted. Around 60 percent of the community was female, and notable for this time, the same percentage was also represented in executive positions.

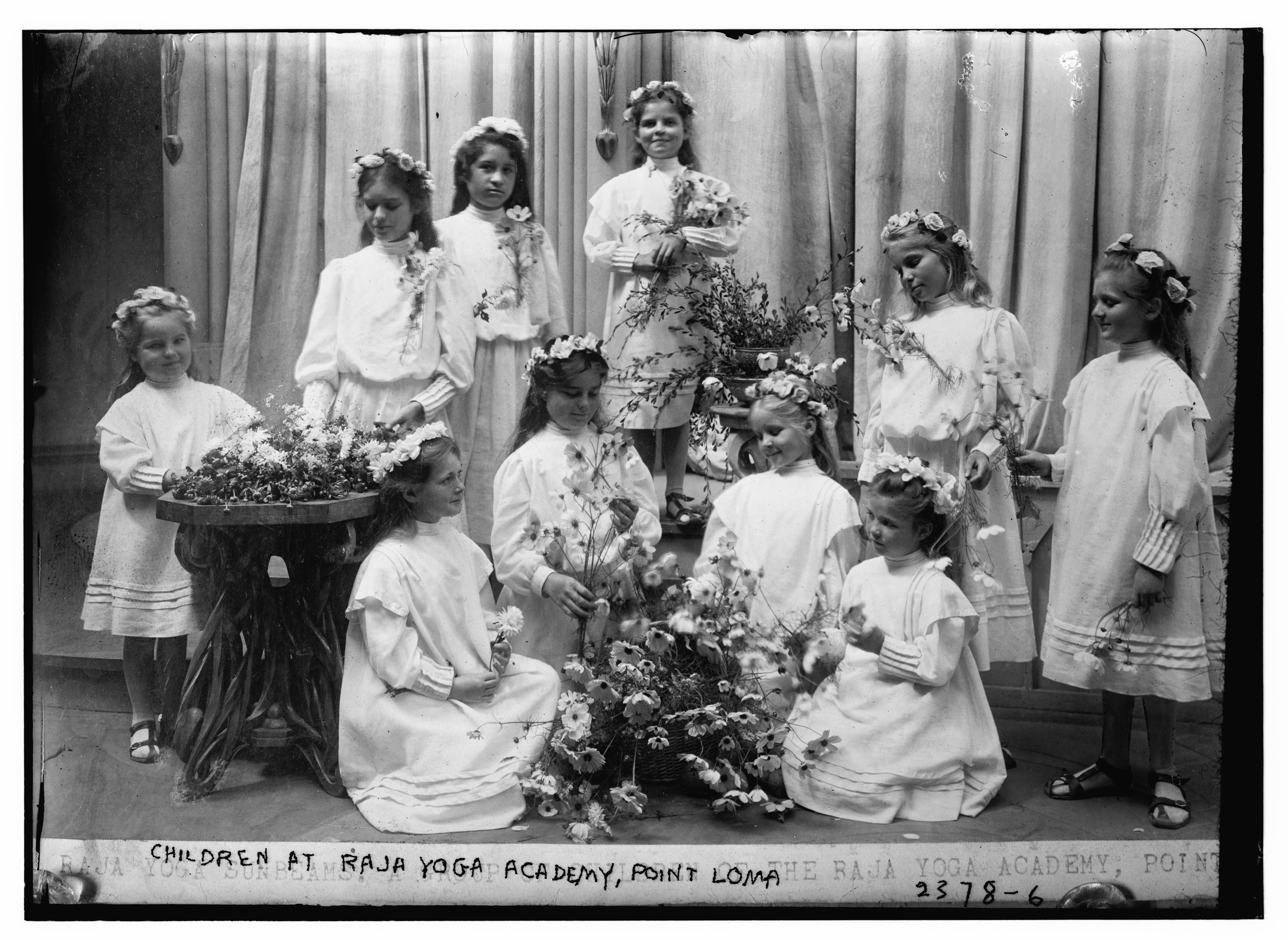
Children at Raja Yoga Academy, Point Loma, 1911

"Raja Yoga" meant divine union, and the educational goals of the school involved not only the intellect, but also moral and spiritual development. The Raja Yoga Academy was a boarding school; over 300 students lived together in group homes that were known as "Lotus Houses." Children from poor families could go to school without paying any charges. The students also played classical dramas, as well as those of Shakespeare. Each student had to learn to play at least one instrument, so that after 1905 the first school orchestra of the United States could hold weekly concerts and go on tour.

A theosophical university was established in 1919. It offered courses in the humanities and in science, and was accredited by the state of California. In 1942 the university was relocated to Covina.

The publishing house changed its name several times, it was called The Theosophical publishing company, Aryan theosophical press, or Theosophical university press.

In 1942 Lomaland was sold, and the Theosophical Society moved to Covina, near Los Angeles.

=== Historic buildings ===
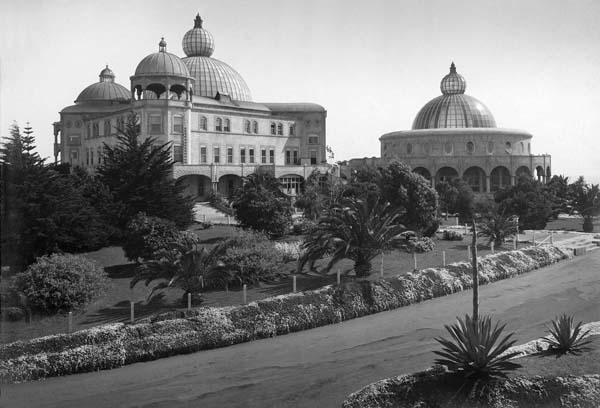
The Raja Yoga Academy and the Temple of Peace, c. 1915

At its height, the community consisted of at least five or six dozen buildings, some quite distinctive. By 1900, the campus was dominated by the imposing Academy Building and the adjoining Temple of Peace. Both buildings were constructed in the Theosophical vernacular that included a flattened arch motif and whimsical references to antiquity. The buildings were topped by amethyst domes, which were lighted at night and could be seen offshore. The entrance to the Temple of Peace was dominated by two massive carved doors that symbolized the Theosophical Principles of spiritual enlightenment and human potential. These doors are currently located in the archives of the San Diego Historical Society. The sculptor, Reginald Machell, was educated in England, but moved to Lomaland with the community in 1899. The interior furnishings he carved for the Academy Building were influenced by the Symbolist style popular in Europe at that time. Machell also supervised the woodworking school at Point Loma. Agricultural experimentation was essential to the Lomaland community's desire to be self-sufficient in all respects.

Lomaland had public buildings for the entire community and several private homes. The home of Albert Spalding, the sporting goods tycoon, was built in 1901. The building combines late-Victorian wooden architecture with historical motifs such as the modified Corinthian column (now shaped like a papyrus leaf) and flattened arches. The amethyst dome was restored by a team of scholars led by Dr. Dwayne Little of the department of history and political science at Point Loma Nazarene University in 1983.

The first Greek theater in North America was built on this site in 1901. It was used for sporting events and theatrical performances. Tessellated pavement and stoa were added in 1909. The theatre was the site of a number of productions of Greek and Shakespearean dramas.

Cabrillo Hall, which served as the International Center Headquarters, and the Brotherhood Headquarters (also called "Wachere Crest" and "Laurel Crest"), was completed in 1909. It served as office for the Theosophical Society and as a residence for Katherine Tingley after 1909. It was originally located on the west side of Pepper Tree Lane but was moved in the early 2000's to the east side. Cabrillo Hall is currently the home of the Communication Studies department.

The reception area was housed in a rectangular building known as the Executive Building. This multi-purpose structure was originally located just southwest of the Academy Building. It served a variety of functions that included telephone and mail services; in 1908 it was used as a display center for the Woman's Exchange and Mart. The unusual truss design in the interior of the building emphasized the square and the circle, which were symbolic of heaven and earth.

=== After the Theosophical Society ===
Lomaland dissolved in the aftermath of the Great Depression of the 1930s and the death of Katherine Tingley in 1929. In 1942, the campus was sold to Coronado developer George W. Wood. The Theosophical Society staff and remaining students moved to Covina. Wood planned to use the buildings and site to create a 5,000 population housing district (after using the property for temporary war housing during World War II.) However, due to limitations in the property transfer agreement and the dangerous condition of many of the buildings on the site, he was allowed to move in only 300 patrons. After Wood died, Dwight Stanford helped purchase the property for the struggling Balboa University, a deal which was finalized on September 15, 1950.

That same year, Balboa University became affiliated with the Southern California Methodist Conference, changed its name to California Western University and relocated to Lomaland. In 1960, the Cal Western law school moved from its downtown location to Rohr Hall at Point Loma to join the rest of the school. The law school received accreditation from the American Bar Association in 1962.

In 1968, California Western University changed its name to United States International University (USIU). The law school, however, retained the name Cal Western. In 1973, the law school relocated from its Point Loma location to the current downtown campus and Pasadena College moved to Point Loma to replace it. USIU moved to Scripps Ranch and in 2001 it merged with California School of Professional Psychology to form Alliant International University. Pasadena College was renamed Point Loma College, then Point Loma Nazarene University, and remains at that location.

== See also ==
- Rosicrucian Egyptian Museum
- Sibyl Anikeef, raised in Lomaland
- Theosophical Society Point Loma - Blavatskyhouse
