= Gottfried de Purucker =

American author and theosophist

- Born: January 15, 1874; Suffern, New York
- Died: September 27, 1942; Covina, California
- Occupation(s): Author and theosophist
- Known for: leader of the Theosophical Society Pasadena
- Predecessor: Katherine Tingley
- Successor: Arthur L. Conger

Gottfried de Purucker (January 15, 1874 – September 27, 1942) was a Theosophist, author and leader of the Theosophical Society Pasadena (then headquartered at Point Loma, California) from 1929-1942.

Purucker's father, an Anglican minister, prepared his son for his future with the church through extensive training in language and religious studies. Purucker recalls having at age 14 translated the entire New Testament from Greek, and at age 17 having translated the Book of Genesis from Hebrew. But he recalls having had an intuition that something was wrong with the church system he grew up in. It was when he began studying eastern religions and philosophies and Theosophy that, in his words: "I realized that the instinct of my soul had been a true one". Of the Theosophical literature, he said: "I read it avidly and studied it eagerly, and then my heart awoke, as my brain had awoke before. But now, from a study of the theosophical literature, my heart awaking, I began to realize what there was, not only in me, but in my fellows; and I said to myself: hereafter my life is consecrate to what I know to be the truth. No man can live unto himself alone; no man can tread the pathway — the still, small, old pathway — of the spiritual self within him, alone."

These experiences led him to the Theosophical Society, which he joined on August 16, 1893. The years from 1893 until 1903 were spent traveling and working, largely in Europe, before moving to Point Loma and joining the staff at Lomaland, the headquarters of the Theosophical Society, under the leadership of Katherine Tingley. Of this period, Purucker said: "all my early life, up till nearly thirty, was passed in the whirl of social and diplomatic and literary and artistic circles, in Geneva, Paris, and other European capitals and big cities. I hated this life, as you can imagine, and when the word came to me from the "Bosses" to pack up and go to Point Loma into years of retirement and training, I felt like a prisoner released from jail, and going home."

From that time forward, Purucker taught classes, gave lectures and wrote several works on Theosophy. He succeeded Katherine Tingley to leadership of the Theosophical Society in 1929 and saw its operations through the great depression. In 1942, he sold the property at Point Loma and moved the headquarters to Covina, California. He died a few months later, on September 27, 1942.

His legacy includes several publications, including elucidations of the writings of Helena Blavatsky. Several additional works were also published posthumously.

== Works ==
- Wind of the Spirit
- Fundamentals of the Esoteric Philosophy
- Occult Glossary
- Encyclopedic Theosophical Glossary (Editor-in-Chief)
- Golden Precepts of Esotericism
- Man in Evolution
- The Esoteric Tradition
- Fountain-Source of Occultism
- The Path of Compassion
- The Four Sacred Seasons
- Studies in Occult Philosophy
- Questions We All Ask
- The Dialogues of G. de Purucker
- Messages to Conventions
- The Masters and the Path of Occultism
- The Story of Jesus
- Word Wisdom in Esoteric Tradition
