= Theosophy =

Religion established in the United States

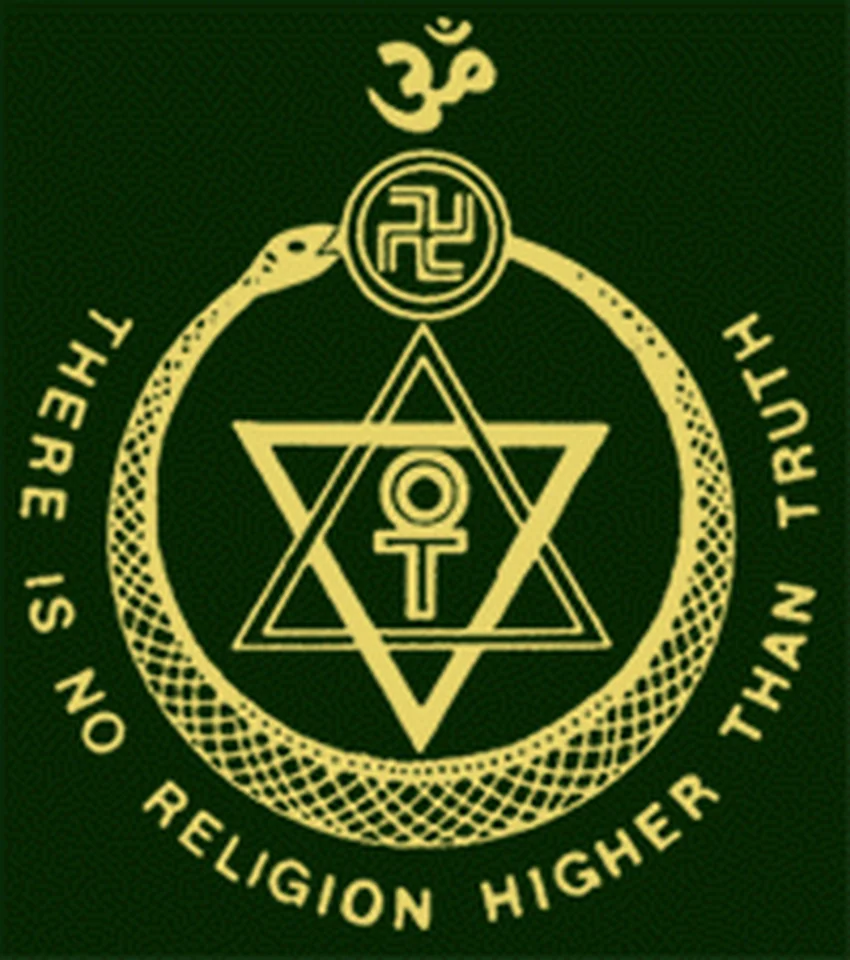
The logo for the Theosophical Society brought together various ancient symbols.

Theosophy is a religious movement established in the United States in the late 19th century. Founded primarily by the Russian Helena Blavatsky and based largely on her writings, it draws heavily from both older European philosophies such as Neoplatonism and Indian religions such as Hinduism and Buddhism. Although many adherents maintain that Theosophy is not a religion, it is variously categorized by religious scholars as both a new religious movement and a form of occultism from within Western esotericism.

According to Blavatsky's Theosophy there is an ancient and secretive brotherhood of spiritual adepts known as the Masters, who are found around the world but primarily centered in Tibet. These Masters were said by Blavatsky to have cultivated great wisdom and had supernatural powers; Theosophists believe they initiated the modern Theosophical movement through disseminating their teachings via Blavatsky. Theosophists believe that these Masters are attempting to revive knowledge of an ancient religion once found around the world that will again come to eclipse existing world religions. Theosophy holds a monist position that there exists a single divine Absolute, and articulates an emanationist cosmology in which the universe is perceived as outward reflections from this Absolute. The purpose of human life is spiritual emancipation and the human soul undergoes reincarnation upon bodily death according to a process of karma. Universal brotherhood and social improvement are guiding principles, although there is no particular ethical framework.

Theosophy was established in New York City in 1875 with the founding of the Theosophical Society by Blavatsky and Americans Henry Olcott and William Quan Judge. In the early 1880s, Blavatsky and Olcott relocated to India, where they established the Society's headquarters at Adyar, Tamil Nadu. Blavatsky described her ideas in two books, Isis Unveiled and The Secret Doctrine, which became key texts within Theosophy. Following her death in 1891, there was a schism in the Society, with Judge leading the Theosophical Society in America (TSA) to split from the international organization. Under Judge's successor Katherine Tingley a Theosophical community named Lomaland was established in San Diego, California. At its height in 1895, there were 102 American branches with nearly 6,000 members. The Adyar-based Society was later taken over by Annie Besant, under whom it grew to its largest extent during the late 1920s, then went into decline after the Great Depression. TSA has since been reincorporated as a national section of the global Theosophical Society, which has a global membership of roughly 26,606 across 70 countries, including over 3,550 in the United States.

Theosophy played a significant role in bringing knowledge of Eastern religions to the West and encouraging cultural pride in South Asia. Many prominent artists and writers have been influenced by Theosophical teachings. Theosophy has an international following, and during the 20th century had tens of thousands of adherents. Theosophical ideas have also inspired over 100 esoteric movements and philosophies, among them Anthroposophy, the Church Universal and Triumphant, and the New Age.

== Definition ==
Helena Blavatsky, the founder of Theosophy, insisted that it was not a religion, although she did refer to it as the modern transmission of the "once-universal religion" that she said had existed deep in the human past. Theosophical organizations have maintained the belief that Theosophy should not be labeled a religion; instead, they regard it as a system that embraces what they see as the "essential truth" underlying religion, philosophy, and science. As a result, Theosophical groups allow their members to hold other religious allegiances, resulting in Theosophists who also identify as Christians, Buddhists, or Hindus.

Scholars of religion who have studied Theosophy have characterized it as a religion. In his history of the Theosophical movement, Bruce F. Campbell noted that Theosophy promoted "a religious world-view" using "explicitly religious terms" and that its central tenets are not unequivocal fact, but rather rely on belief. Olav Hammer and Mikael Rothstein termed it "one of the modern world's most important religious traditions". Various scholars have pointed to its eclectic nature; Joscelyn Godwin described it as a "universally eclectic religious movement", while scholar J. Jeffrey Franklin characterized Theosophy as a "hybrid religion" for its syncretic combination of elements from various other sources. More specifically, Theosophy has been categorized as a new religious movement. According to Maria Carlson, Theosophy is a "positivistic religion" "offering a seemingly logical theology based on pseudoscience."

Scholars have also classified Theosophy as a form of Western esotericism. Campbell for instance referred to it as "an esoteric religious tradition", while the historian Joy Dixon called it an "esoteric religion". More specifically, it is considered a form of occultism. Along with other groups such as the Hermetic Order of the Golden Dawn, the Theosophical Society has been seen as part of an "occult revival" that took place in Western countries during the late 19th century. The historian of religion Wouter Hanegraaff noted that Theosophy helped to establish the "essential foundations for much of twentieth-century esotericism".

Although Theosophy draws upon Indian religious beliefs, the sociologist of religion Christopher Partridge observed that "Theosophy is fundamentally Western. That is to say, Theosophy is not Eastern thought in the West, but Western thought with an Eastern flavour."

=== Etymology ===
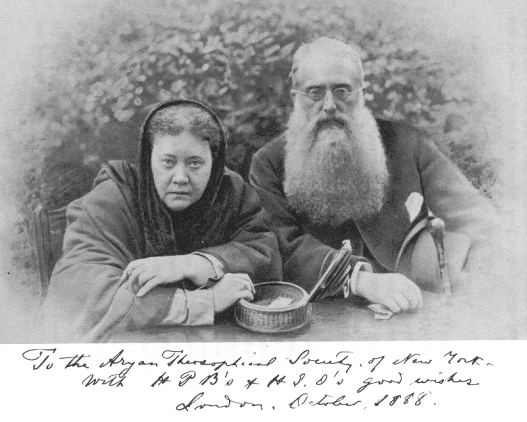
Blavatsky and Olcott, two of the founding members of the Theosophical Society

At a meeting of the Miracle Club in New York City on 7 September 1875, Blavatsky, Olcott, and Judge agreed to establish an organisation, with Charles Sotheran suggesting that they call it the Theosophical Society. Prior to adopting the name "Theosophical", they had debated various potential names, among them the Egyptological Society, the Hermetic Society, and the Rosicrucian Society.

The term was not new; originally it appeared in the works of early Church Fathers, as a synonym for theology. It derives from Ancient Greek: θεός, romanized: theós, lit. 'god' and Ancient Greek: σοφῐ́ᾱ, romanized: sophíā, lit. 'wisdom'; thus meaning "god-wisdom", "divine wisdom", or "wisdom of God". Its esoteric meaning emerged during the Renaissance period, possibly originating in the 1575 Arbatel De Magia Veterum, a Latin grimoire and the first work to draw a dualism between what it calls "anthroposophia" (human knowledge) and "theosophia" (divine knowledge). It had consequently been used in various esoterics contexts for example by the Philaletheians and by the Christian mystic Jakob Böhme. In her 1889 book The Key to Theosophy, Blavatsky claims that the term Theosophy had been coined by "the Alexandrian philosophers", especially Ammonius Saccas.

Blavatsky's Theosophy is not the only movement to use the term "theosophy" and this has resulted in scholarly attempts to differentiate the different currents. Godwin drew a division by referring to Blavatskian Theosophy with a capital letter and older, Boehmian theosophy with a lower-case letter. Alternately, the scholar of esotericism Wouter J. Hanegraaff distinguished the Blavatskian movement from its older namesake by terming it "modern Theosophy". Followers of Blavatsky's movement are known as Theosophists, while adherents of the older tradition are termed theosophers. Causing some confusion, a few Theosophists—such as C. C. Massey—were also theosophers. In the early years of Blavatsky's movement, some critics referred to it as "Neo-Theosophy" to differentiate it from the older Christian theosophy movement. The term "Neo-Theosophy" would later be adopted within the modern Theosophical movement itself, where it was used—largely pejoratively—to describe the teachings promoted by Annie Besant and Charles Webster Leadbeater by those who opposed their innovations.

According to the scholar of religion James A. Santucci, discerning what the term "Theosophy" meant to the early Theosophists is "not as obvious as one might think". As used by Olcott, the term "Theosophy" appeared to be applied to an approach that emphasized experimentation as a means of learning about the "Unseen Universe"; conversely, Blavatsky used the term in reference to gnosis regarding said information.

== Beliefs and teachings ==
Although the writings of prominent Theosophists lay out a set of teachings, the Theosophical Society itself states that it has no official beliefs with which all members must agree. It, therefore, has doctrine but does not present it as dogma. The Society stated that the only tenet to which all members should subscribe was a commitment "to form a nucleus of the Universal Brotherhood of Humanity without distinction of race, creed, sex, caste or color". This means that there are members of the Theosophical Society who are skeptical about many, or even all, of the Theosophical doctrines while remaining sympathetic to its basic aim of universal brotherhood.

As noted by Santucci, Theosophy is "derived primarily from the writings" of Blavatsky, but revisions and innovations have also been produced by subsequent Theosophists such as Annie Besant and Charles Webster Leadbeater. Blavatsky said that these Theosophical doctrines were not her own invention but had been received from a brotherhood of secretive spiritual adepts whom she referred to as the "Masters" or "Mahatmas".

=== The Masters ===
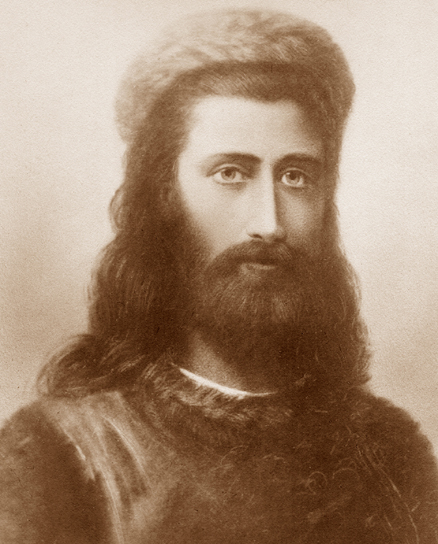
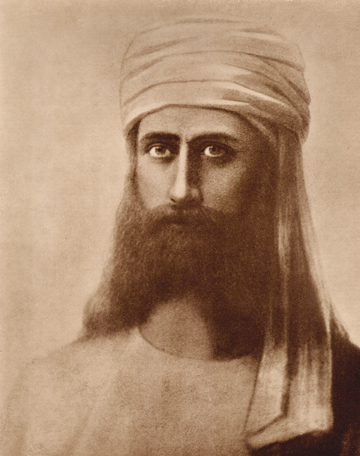
Hermann Schmiechen's 1884 depiction of the two Masters with whom Blavatsky was said to be in contact, Koot Hoomi (left) and Morya (right)

Central to Theosophical belief is the idea that a group of spiritual adepts known as the Masters not only presently exist but were responsible for producing early Theosophical texts. For most Theosophists, these Masters are deemed the real founders of the modern Theosophical movement. In Theosophical literature, these Masters are also referred to as the Mahatmas, Adepts, Masters of Wisdom, Masters of Compassion, and Elder Brothers. They are perceived to be a fraternity of human men who are highly evolved in terms of having both moral development and intellectual attainment. They are said to have achieved extra-long life spans, and to have gained supernatural powers, including clairvoyance and the ability to instantly project their soul out of their body to any other location. These are powers they have allegedly attained through many years of training. According to Blavatsky, by the late 19th century, their chief residence was in the Himalayan kingdom of Tibet. She also said that these Masters were the source of many of her published writings.

The Masters are believed to preserve the world's ancient spiritual knowledge, and to represent a Great White Brotherhood or White Lodge, which watches over humanity and guides its evolution. Among those whom the early Theosophists believed as Masters were Biblical figures such as Abraham, Moses, Solomon, and, in the Christian Bible, Jesus, as well as Asian religious figures such as Gautama Buddha, Confucius, and Laozi, and modern individuals such as Jakob Bohme, Alessandro Cagliostro, and Franz Mesmer. However, the most prominent Masters to appear in Theosophical literature are Koot Hoomi (sometimes spelled Kuthumi) and Morya, with whom Blavatsky declared to be in contact. According to Theosophical belief, the Masters approach those deemed worthy to embark on an apprenticeship or chelaship. The apprentice would then undergo several years of probation, during which they would live a life of physical purity, remaining chaste, abstinent, and indifferent to physical luxury. Blavatsky encouraged the production of images of the Masters. The most important portraits of the Masters to be produced were created in 1884 by Hermann Schmiechen. According to scholar of religion Massimo Introvigne, Schmiechen's images of Morya and Koot Humi gained "semi-canonical status" in the Theosophical community, being regarded as sacred objects rather than simply decorative images.

Campbell noted that for non-Theosophists, the hypotheses regarding the existence of the Masters are among the weakest made by the movement. Such statements can be examined and potentially refuted, challenging the existence of the Masters and thereby undermining Theosophical beliefs. The idea of a brotherhood of secret adepts had a long pedigree stretching back several centuries before the foundation of Theosophy; such ideas can be found in the work of the Rosicrucians and were popularized in the fictional literature of Edward Bulwer-Lytton. The idea of having messages conveyed to a medium through spiritually advanced entities had also been popularized at the time of Theosophy's foundation through the Spiritualist movement.

=== The ancient wisdom religion ===
According to Blavatsky's teachings, many of the world's religions have their origins in a universal ancient religion, a "secret doctrine" that was known to Plato and early Hindu sages and which continues to underpin every religion. She argued that ancient societies demonstrated a unity of science and religion that humanity has since lost, with their achievements and knowledge far exceeding what modern scholars believe about them. Blavatsky also taught that a secret brotherhood had conserved this ancient wisdom religion throughout the centuries and that members of this fraternity hold the key to understanding miracles, the afterlife, and psychic phenomena, and that moreover, these adepts themselves have paranormal powers.

She stated that this ancient religion would be revived and spread throughout humanity in the future, replacing dominant world religions such as Christianity, Islam, Buddhism, and Hinduism. Theosophy emphasized the importance of ancient texts over the popular rituals and customs within various religious traditions. Theosophical depiction of Buddhism and Hinduism, however, drew criticism both from practitioners of orthodox Buddhist and Hindu traditions, as well as from Western scholars of these traditions, such as Max Müller, who believed that Theosophists such as Blavatsky were misrepresenting the Asian traditions.

=== Theology and cosmology ===
Theosophy advocates an emanationist cosmology, asserting that the universe is an outward reflection of the Absolute. Theosophy presents the idea that the world as humans perceive it is illusory, or maya, an idea that it draws from Asian religions. Accordingly, Blavatsky taught that a life limited by the perception of this illusory world was ignorant and deluded.

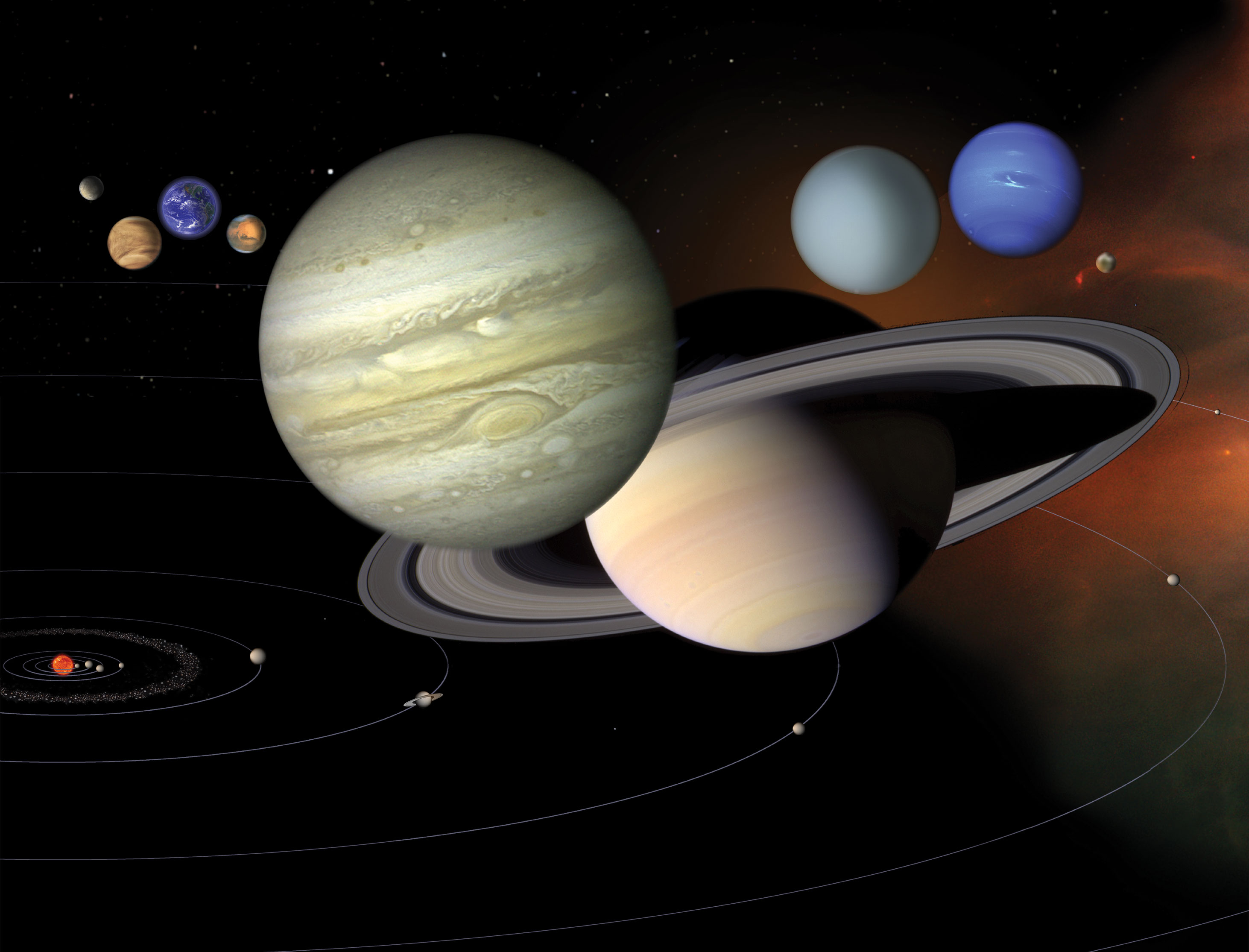
According to Theosophical teaching, each solar system is an emanation of a "Logos" or "Solar Deity", with planetary spirits each overseeing one of the planets.

According to Blavatsky's teaching, every solar system in the universe is the expression of what is termed a "Logos" or "Solar Deity". Below the solar deity are seven planetary spirits or ministers, with each of these celestial beings controlling the evolution on a specific planet. In The Secret Doctrine, Blavatsky stated that each planet had a sevenfold constitution, known as the "Planetary Chains"; these consist not only of a physical globe but also of two astral bodies, two mental bodies, and two spiritual bodies, all overlapping in the same space. According to Blavatsky, evolution occurs in descending and ascending arcs, from the first spiritual globe to the first mental globe, then from the first astral globe to the first physical globe, and then on from there. She said there were different levels of evolution, from mineral to vegetable, animal, human, and then to superhuman or spiritual. Different levels of evolution occur in successive order on each planet; thus, when mineral evolution ends on the first planet, and it proceeds on to vegetable evolution, then mineral evolution begins on the second planet. Theosophy teaches that human evolution is tied to this planetary and wider cosmic evolution.

In The Secret Doctrine, Blavatsky advocated the idea of seven "Root Races", each of which was divided into seven "Sub-Races". In Blavatsky's cosmogony, the first Root Race was created from pure spirit and lived on a continent known as the "Imperishable Sacred Land". The second Root Race, known as the Hyperboreans, were also formed from pure spirit and lived on a land near to the North Pole, which then had a mild climate. The third lived on the continent of Lemuria, which Blavatsky alleged survives today as Australia and Rapa Nui. Blavatsky alleged that during the fourth Round of the Earth, higher beings descended to the planet, with the beginnings of human physical bodies developing and the sexes separating. At this point, the fourth Root Race appeared, living on the continent of Atlantis; they had physical bodies but also psychic powers and advanced technology. She said that some Atlanteans were giants and built such ancient monuments as Stonehenge in southern England and that they also mated with "she-animals", resulting in the creation of gorillas and chimpanzees. The Atlanteans were decadent and abused their power and knowledge, so Atlantis sank into the sea, although various Atlanteans escaped and created new societies in Egypt and the Americas.

The fifth Root Race to emerge was the Aryans, which was found worldwide when she was writing. She believed that the fifth Race would come to be replaced by the sixth, which would be heralded by the arrival of Maitreya, a figure from Mahayana Buddhist mythology. She further believed that humanity would eventually develop into the final, seventh Root Race. At this, she stated that humanity would have reached the end of its evolutionary cycle and that life would withdraw from the Earth. Lachman suggested that by reading Blavatsky's cosmogonical beliefs as a literal account of history, "we may be doing it a disservice." He instead suggested that it could be read as Blavatsky's attempt to formulate "a new myth for the modern age, or as a huge, fantastic science fiction story".

==== Maitreya and messianism ====
Blavatsky taught that Lord Maitreya—a figure she borrowed from Buddhism—would come to Earth as a messianic figure. Her ideas on this were expanded upon by Besant and Leadbeater. They said that Maitreya had previously incarnated onto the Earth as Krishna, a figure from Hinduism. They also said that he had entered Jesus of Nazareth at the time of the latter's baptism and that henceforth Maitreya would be known as "the Christ". Besant and Leadbeater said that Maitreya would again come to Earth by manifesting through an Indian boy named Jiddu Krishnamurti, whom Leadbeater had encountered playing on a beach at Adyar in 1909. The introduction of the Krishnamurti belief into Theosophy has been identified as a millenarian element.

=== Personal development and reincarnation ===
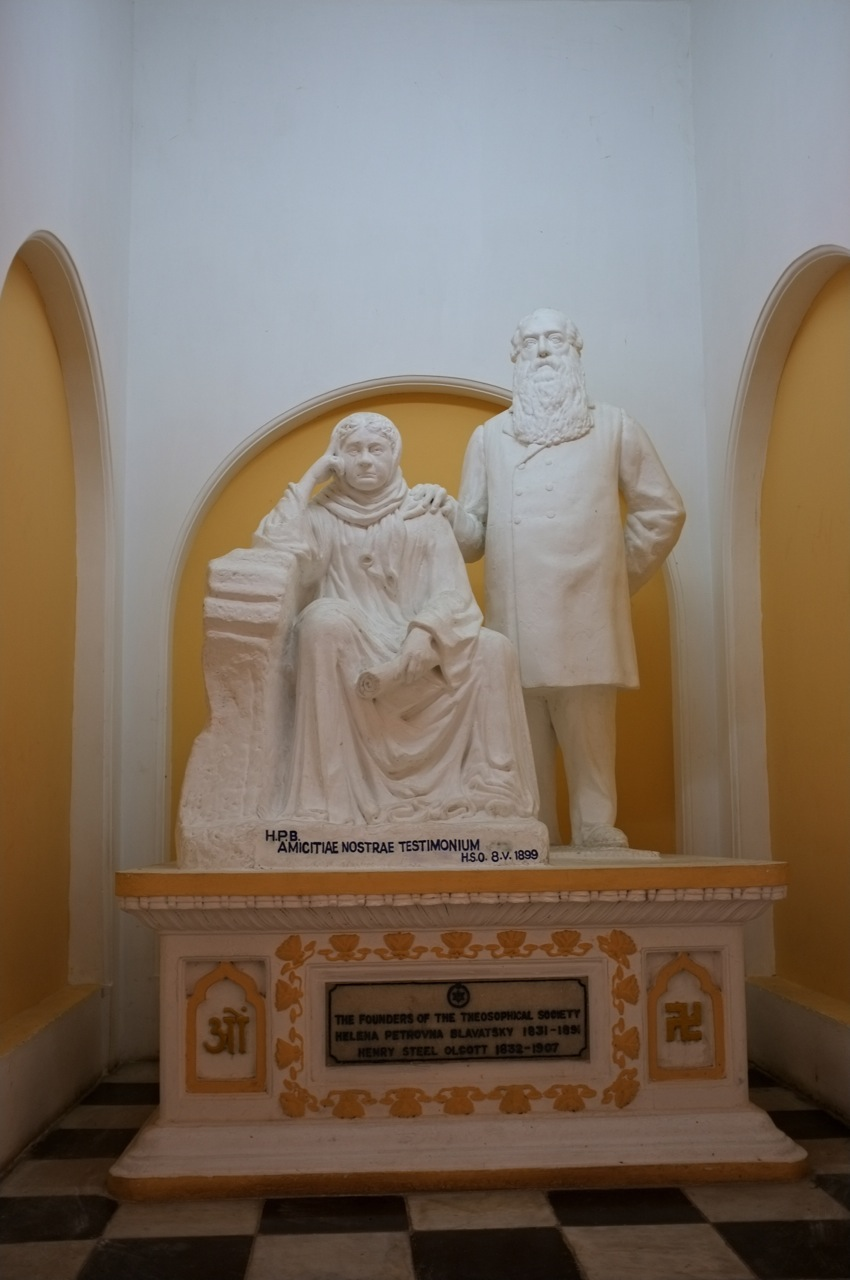
Statue of Blavatsky and Olcott at Adyar

According to Theosophy, the purpose of human life is the spiritual emancipation of the soul. The human individual is described as an "Ego" or "Monad" and believed to have emanated from the Solar Deity, to whom it will also eventually return. The human being is presented as composed of seven parts while operating on three separate planes of being. As presented by Sinnett and often repeated in Theosophical literature, these seven parts are the Body (Rupa), Vitality (Prana-Jiva), the Astral Body (Linga Sarira), the Animal Soul (Kama-Rupa), the Human Soul (Manas), the Spiritual Soul (Buddhi), and the Spirit (Atma). According to Theosophical teaching, the latter three of these components are immortal, while the other aspects perish following bodily death. Theosophy teaches that the Spiritual Soul and the Spirit do not reside within the human body alongside the other components but are connected to it through the human soul.

In The Voice of the Silence, Blavatsky said that within each human, there is an eternal, divine facet, which she referred to as "the Master," the "uncreate," the "inner God," and the "higher self." She promoted the idea that uniting with this "higher self" results in wisdom. In that same book, she compared the progress of the human soul to a transition through three halls; the first was that of ignorance, which is the state of the soul before it understands the need to unite with its higher self. The second is the Hall of Learning, in which the individual becomes aware of other facets of human life but is distracted by an interest in psychic powers. The third is the Hall of Wisdom, in which union with the higher self is made; the Vale of Bliss follows this. At this point, the human soul can merge into the One.

==== Reincarnation and karma ====
Throughout her writings, Blavatsky made a variety of statements about rebirth and the afterlife, and there is a discrepancy between her earlier and later teachings on the subject. Between the 1870s and c. 1882, Blavatsky taught a doctrine called "metempsychosis". In Isis Unveiled, Blavatsky stated that the human soul progresses through more spiritual planes on bodily death. Two years later, she introduced the idea of reincarnation into Theosophical doctrine, using it to replace her metempsychosis doctrine. In The Secret Doctrine, she stated that the spirit was immortal and would repeatedly incarnate into a new, mortal soul and body on Earth. According to Theosophical teaching, human spirits will always be reborn into human bodies and not into those of any other life forms. Blavatsky stated that spirits would not be reborn until some time after bodily death and never during the lifetime of the deceased's relatives.

Blavatsky taught that on the death of the body, the astral body survives for a time in a state called kama-loka, which she compared to limbo, before also dying. According to this belief, the human then moves into its mental body in a realm called devachan, which she compared to Heaven or paradise. Blavatsky taught that the soul remained in devachan for 1000 to 1500 years, although the Theosophist Charles Webster Leadbeater said that it was only 200.

Theosophy espouses the existence of karma as a system that regulates the cycle of reincarnation, ensuring that an individual's actions in one life affect the circumstances of the next one. This belief, therefore, seeks to explain why misery and suffering exist in the world, attributing any misfortune that someone suffers as punishment for misdeeds that they perpetrated in a prior life. In Blavatsky's words, karma and reincarnation were "inextricably interwoven". However, she did not believe that karma had always been the system that governed reincarnation; she believed that it came into being when humans developed egos and that one day it would also no longer be required.

Besant and Leadbeater said they were able to investigate people's past lives through reading the akashic record, an etheric store of all the knowledge of the universe. They, for instance, stated to have attained knowledge of their own past lives as monkey-like creatures residing on the moon, where they served as pets to the "Moon-man" (a prior incarnation of the Master Morya), his wife (Koot Humi), and their child (the Lord Maitreya). When they were attacked by "savages" and animals "resembling furry lizards and crocodiles", Besant sacrificed herself to save Morya, and for that act made the karmic evolutionary leap to becoming a human in her next incarnation.

=== Morality and ethics ===
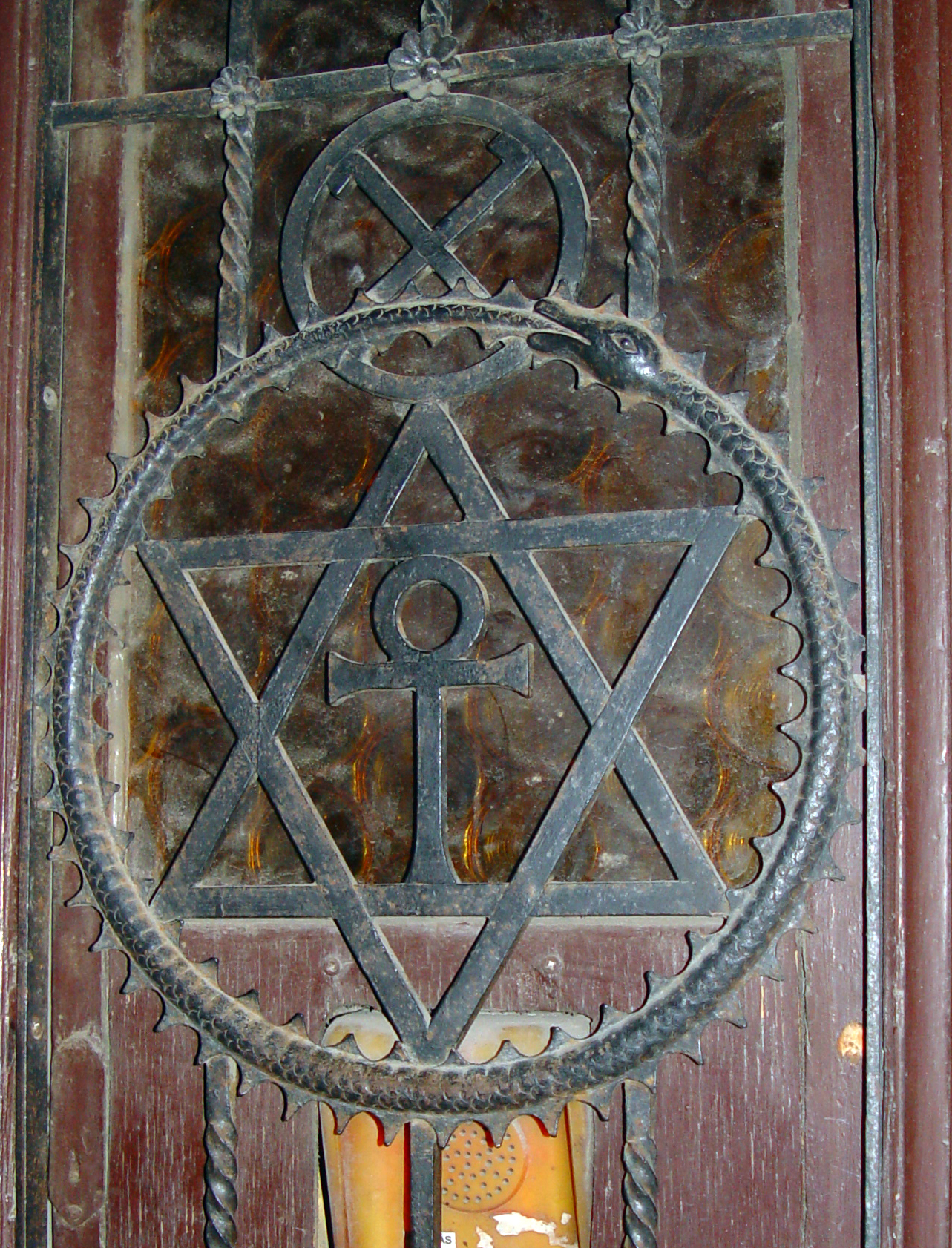
The Theosophical seal as door decoration in Budapest, Hungary

Theosophy does not express any formal ethical teaching, a situation that generated ambiguity. However, it has expressed and promoted certain values, such as brotherhood and social improvement. During its early years, the Theosophical Society promoted a puritanical attitude toward sexuality, for instance, by encouraging chastity even within marriage.

By 1911, the Theosophical Society was involved in projects connected to a range of progressive political causes. In England, there were strong links between Theosophy and first-wave feminism. Based on a statistical analysis, Dixon noted that prominent English feminists of the period were several hundred times more likely to join the Theosophical Society than the average member of the country's population. Theosophical contingents took part in feminist marches of the period; for instance, a Theosophical group operating under the banner of Universal Co-Freemasonry marched as part of the Women's Coronation Procession in 1911.

=== Ritual ===
The Theosophical Society did not prescribe specific rituals for adherents to practice. However, ritualized practices have been established by various Theosophical groups; one such group is the Liberal Catholic Church. Another is the meetings of the United Lodge of Theosophists, which has been characterized as having a "quasi-sacred and quasi-liturgical" character.

== Historical development ==
The American social situation from which the Theosophical Society emerged was one of great upheaval, and the religious situation was one of challenge to orthodox Christianity. The forces that had surfaced in spiritualism included anticlericalism, anti-institutionalism, eclecticism, social liberalism, and belief in progress and individual effort. Occultism, mediated to America in the form of Mesmerism, Swedenborgianism, Freemasonry, and Rosicrucianism, was present. Recent developments in science led by the 1870s to renewed interest in reconciling science and religion. There was present also a hope that Asian religious ideas could be integrated into a grand religious synthesis.

— Bruce F. Campbell, 1980

The Theosophical Society was largely the creation of two individuals: Helena Blavatsky and Henry Steel Olcott. Established Christianity in the United States was experiencing challenges in the second half of the nineteenth century, a result of rapid urbanization and industrialization, high rates of immigration, and the growing understanding of evolutionary theory which challenged traditional Christian accounts of history. Various new religious communities were established in different parts of the country, among them the Free Religious Association, New Thought, Christian Science, and Spiritualism. Theosophy would inherit the idea—then popular in the United States—that emphasized the idea of free will and the inevitability of progress, including on a spiritual level. It was also influenced by a growing knowledge about Asian religions in the United States.

Prior to her arrival in the United States, Blavatsky had experience with esoteric currents such as Spiritualism. It was through Spiritualism that Blavatsky and Olcott met.

In 1884, Olcott established the first Scottish lodge, in Edinburgh.

In 1980, Campbell noted that Theosophical books were selling at record levels.

In the United States, Judge had been devoting himself to the promotion of Theosophy with little success.

=== Post-Blavatsky ===
During her lifetime, Blavatsky had suggested to many different people that they would be her successor. Three of the most prominent candidates—Olcott, Judge, and Besant—all met in London shortly after her death to discuss the situation. Judge said that he too was in contact with the Masters, and that they had provided him with a message instructing him to co-delegate the Society's Esoteric Section with Besant. Olcott, however, suspected that the notes from the Masters which Judge was producing were forged, exacerbating tensions between them. Besant attempted to act as a bridge between the two men, while Judge informed her that the Masters had revealed to him a plot that Olcott was orchestrating to kill her. In 1893, Besant came down on Olcott's side in the argument and backed the internal proceedings that Olcott raised against Judge. A two-stage enquiry took place, which concluded that because the Society took no official stance on whether the Masters existed or not, Judge could not be considered guilty of forgery and would be allowed to retain his position. The details of this trial were leaked to the journalist F. Edmund Garrett, who used them as the basis of his critical book, Isis Very Much Unveiled. Judge then announced that the Masters had informed him that he should take sole control of the Esoteric Section, deposing Besant; she rejected his beliefs. Amid calls from Olcott that Judge should stand down, in April 1895 the American section voted to secede from the main Society. Judge remained its leader, but died within a year.

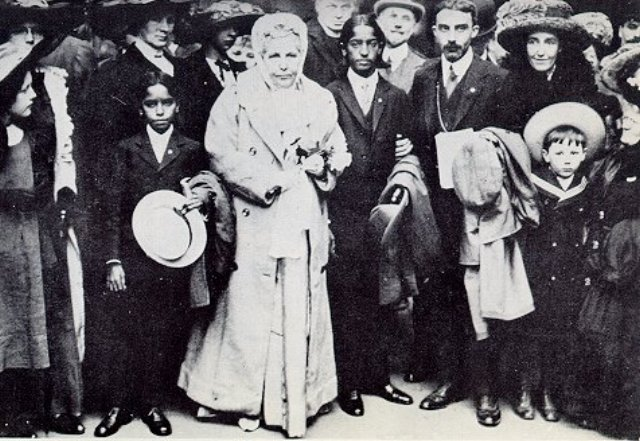
Besant with the child Krishnamurti

Olcott then sent Besant to the United States to gain support for the Adyar-based Society. In this she was successful, gaining thousands of new members and establishing many new branches. Besant had developed a friendship with the Theosophist Charles Webster Leadbeater, and together they co-wrote a number of books. Leadbeater was controversial, and concerns were raised when he was found to have instructed two boys in masturbation. The American Section of the Theosophical Society raised internal charges against him, although Besant came to his defense. In a move probably designed to limit negative publicity for the Society, they accepted his resignation rather than expelling him.

On Olcott's death in 1907, he had nominated Besant to be his successor, and she was then elected to the position with a large majority in June. In her first years as the head of the Society, Besant oversaw a dramatic growth in its membership, raising it by 50%, to 23,000. She also oversaw an expansion of the Adyar property, from 27 to 253 acres. Besant was involved in various activist causes, promoting women's rights in India through the Women's Indian Association and helping to establish both the Central Hindu College and a Hindu girls' school. Besant also began a campaign for Indian Home Rule, founding a group called the Home Rule League. She established the New India newspaper, and after continuing to promote Indian independence in the paper's pages during the First World War she was interned for several months. This helped to boost her status within the independence movement, and at the age of 70 she was appointed President of the Indian National Congress, a largely honorary position.

In December 1908, Leadbeater was readmitted to the Society; this generated a wave of resignations, with the Sydney branch seceding to form the Independent Theosophical Society. Leadbeater traveled to Adyar, where he met a young boy living there, Jiddu Krishnamurti, and pronounced him to be the next incarnation of a figure called the World Teacher. He subsequently took control of the boy's instruction for two years. With Besant, Leadbeater established a group known as the Order of the Star in the East to promote the idea of Krishnamurti as World Teacher. Leadbeater also wanted more ritual within Theosophy, and to achieve this he and J. I. Wedgwood became bishops in the Old Catholic Church. They then split from that to form their own Liberal Catholic Church, which was independent from the Theosophical Society (Adyar) while retaining an affiliation with it. The Church drew most of its membership from the Society and heavily relied upon its resources. However, in 1919 the Church was marred by police investigations into allegations that six of its priests had engaged in acts of pedophilia and Wedgewood—who was implicated in the allegations—resigned from the organization.

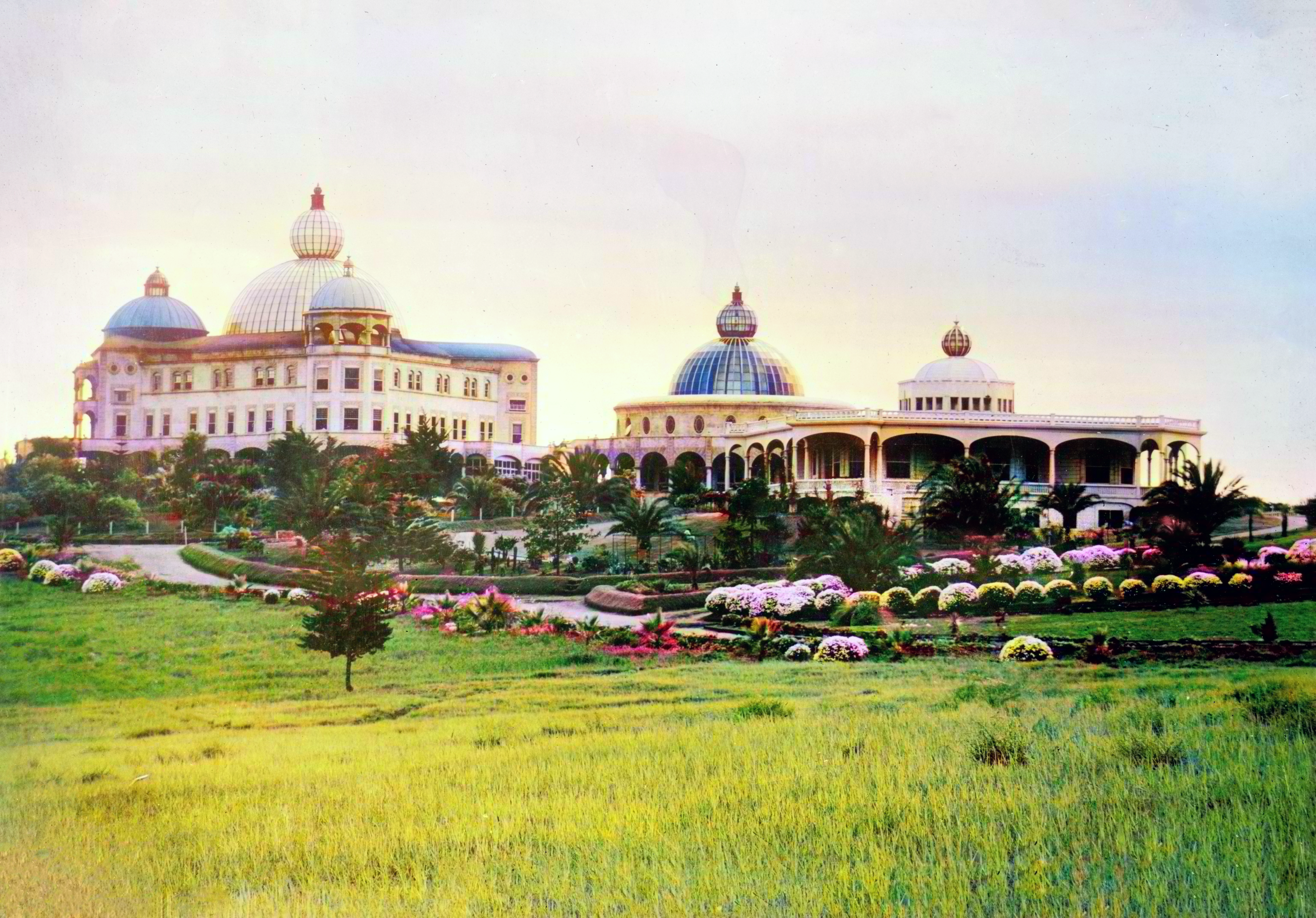
The Raja Yoga Academy and the Temple of Peace, Point Loma, San Diego, c. 1915

In retaliation, a "Back to Blavatsky" movement emerged within the Society. Its members pejoratively referred to Besant and her followers as practitioners of "Neo-Theosophy", objecting to the Liberal Catholic Church's allegiance to the Pope, and to the prominence that they were according to Besant and Leadbeater's publications. The main benefactor of the disquiet within the Back to Blavatsky movement was a rival group called the United Lodge of Theosophists. One of the most prominent figures to switch allegiance was B. P. Wadia. The United Lodge of Theosophists had been established in Los Angeles in 1909, when it had split from Judge's Theosophical Society in America, seeking to minimize formal organization. It focused on publishing new editions of Blavatsky and Judge's writings, as well as other books, which were usually released anonymously so as to prevent any personality cults developing within the Theosophical movement.

The Adyar Society membership later peaked at 40,000 in the late 1920s. The Order of the Star had 30,000 members at its height. Krishnamurti himself repudiated these beliefs, insisting that he was not the World Teacher, and then resigned from the Society; the effect on the society was dramatic, as it lost a third of its membership over the coming few years. Besant died in 1933, when the Society was taken over by George Arundale, who led it until 1945; the group's activities were greatly curtailed by World War II.

Judge left no clear successor as leader of the Theosophical Society in America, but the position was taken by Katherine Tingley, who said that she remained in mediumistic contact with Judge's spirit. Tingley launched an international campaign to promote her Theosophical group, sending delegations to Europe, Egypt, and India. In the latter country they clashed with the Adyar-based Theosophical Society, and were unsuccessful in gaining converts. Her leadership would be challenged by Ernest T. Hargrove in 1898, and when he failed he split to form his own rival group. In 1897, Tingley had established a Theosophical community, Lomaland, at Point Loma in San Diego, California. Various Theosophical writers and artists congregated there, while horticultural development was also emphasized. In 1919, the community helped establish a Theosophical University. Longstanding financial problems coupled with an aging population resulted in the Society selling Lomaland in 1942. Meanwhile, Tingley's death in 1929 had resulted in the Theosophical Society in America being taken over by Gottfried de Purucker, who promoted rapprochement with other Theosophical groups in what came to be known as the Fraternisation movement.

== Demographics ==
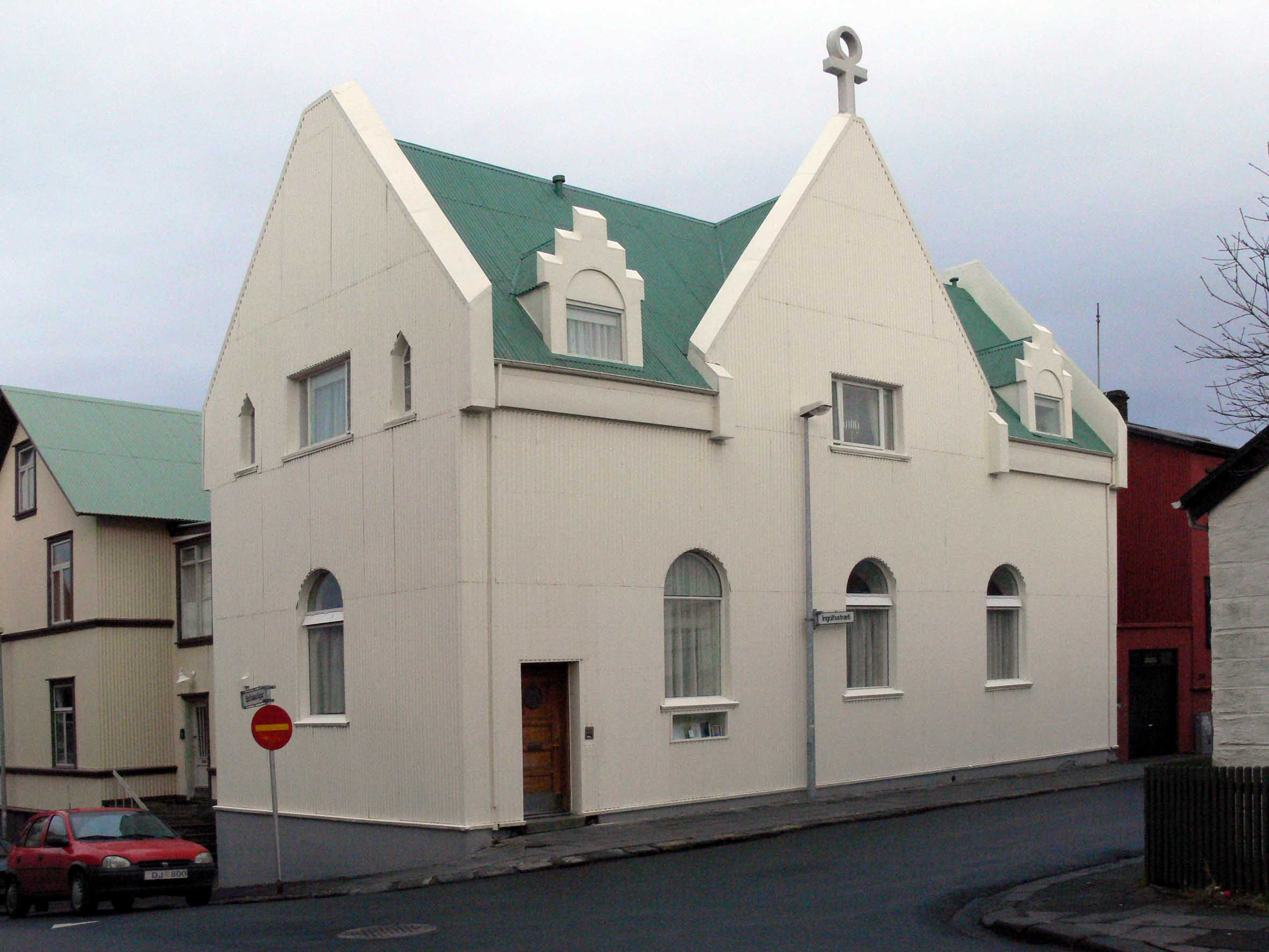
Theosophical Society lodge building in Reykjavík, Iceland

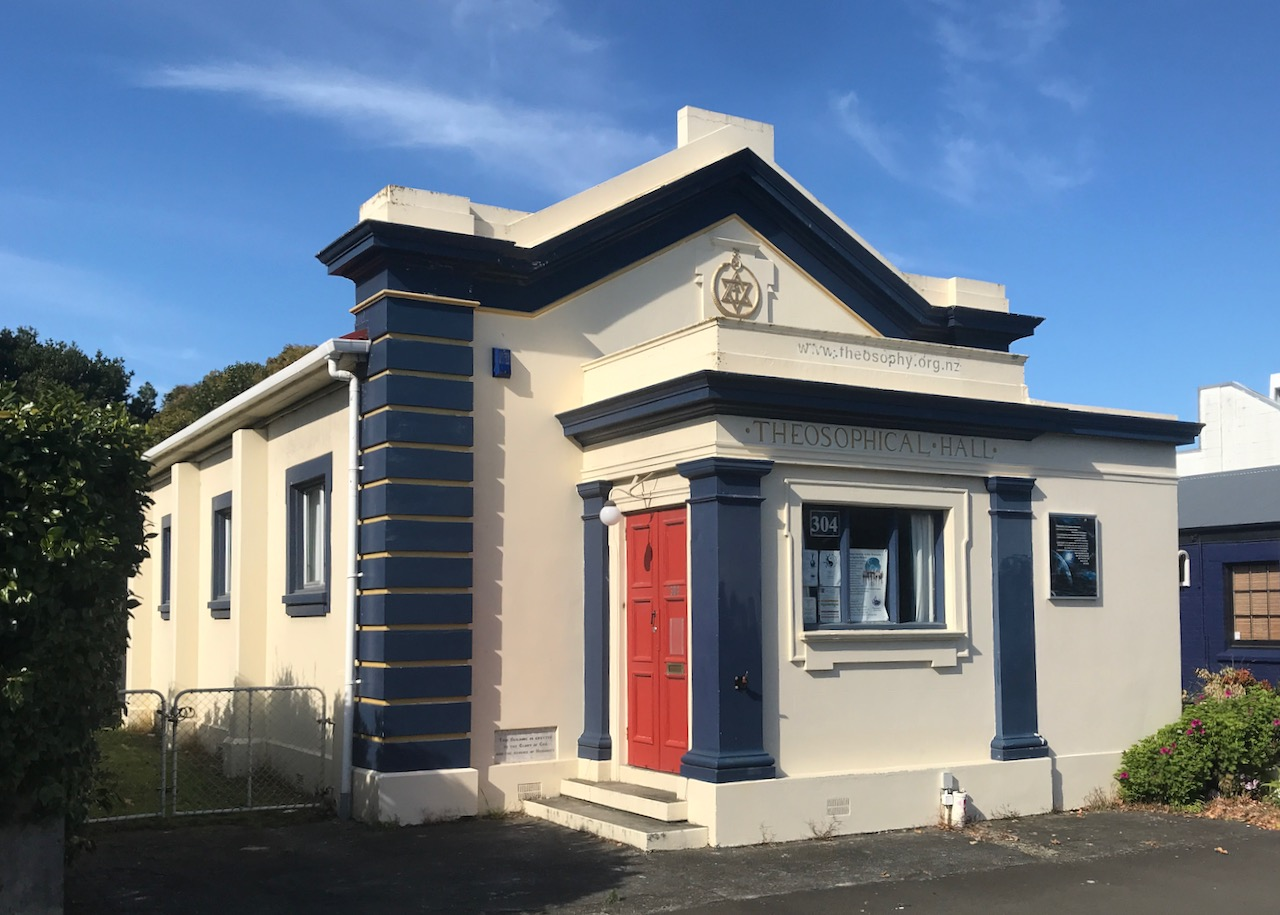
Theosophical Hall in Palmerston North, New Zealand

During its first century, Theosophy established itself as an international movement. Campbell believed that from its foundation until 1980, Theosophy had gained tens of thousands of adherents. He noted that in that latter year, there were about 35,000 members of the Adyar-based Theosophical Society (9000 of whom were in India), c. 5,500 members of the Theosophical Society in America, c. 1,500 members of the Theosophical Society International (Pasadena), and about 1200 members of the United Lodge of Theosophy. Membership of the Theosophical Society reached its highest peak in 1928, with 45,000 members. The HPB Lodge in Auckland, New Zealand, was one of the world's largest, with over 500 members in 1949.

Theosophical groups consist largely of individuals as opposed to family groups. Campbell noted that these members were alienated in ways from conventional social roles and practices.

As noted by Dixon, in the late nineteenth and early twentieth centuries, the Theosophical Society "appealed above all to an elite, educated, middle- and upper-middle-class constituency". It was, in her words, "a religion for the 'thinking classes'." Campbell stated that Theosophy attracted "unconventional, liberal-minded Westerners", and according to Dixon they were among those "who constituted themselves as the humanitarian conscience of the middle classes, a dissident minority who worked in a variety of parallel organizations to critique the dominant bourgeois values and culture."

Campbell also noted that Theosophy appealed to educated Asians, particularly Indians, because it identified Asia as central to a universal ancient religion and allowed Asians to retain traditional religious beliefs and practices within a modern framework.

== Reception and legacy ==
Hammer and Rothstein believed that the formation and early history of the Theosophical Society was one of the "pivotal chapters of religious history in the West." The Theosophical Society had significant effects on religion, politics, culture, and society. In the Western world, it was a major force for the introduction of Asian religious ideas. In 1980, Campbell described it as "probably the most important non-traditional or occult group in the last century", while in 2012 Santucci noted that it had had "a profound impact on the contemporary religious landscape".

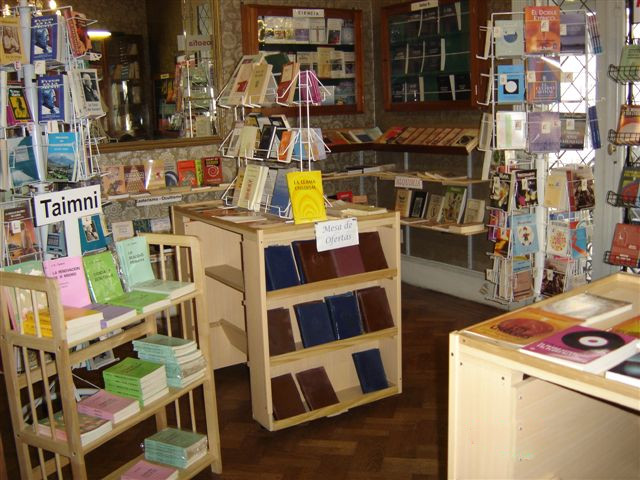
A Theosophical bookshop in Buenos Aires, Argentina

In approaching Asian religion with respect and treating its religious beliefs seriously, Blavatsky and Olcott influenced South Asian society. In India, it played an important role in the Indian independence movement and in the Buddhist revival. The Indian independence leader Mahatma Gandhi developed much of his interest in Hindu culture after being given a copy of the Bhagavad Gita by two Theosophists. Alongside her support for Indian home rule, Besant had also supported home rule for Scotland, Wales, and Ireland. Campbell suggested that Theosophy could be seen as a "grandfather" movement to this 20th century growth in Asian spirituality. Given the spread of such ideas in the West, some critics have perceived Theosophy's role as being largely obsolete.

=== Influence on the arts and culture ===
Many important figures, in particular within the humanities and the arts, were involved in the Theosophical movement and influenced by its teachings. Prominent scientists who had belonged to the Theosophical Society included the inventor Thomas Edison, the biologist Alfred Russel Wallace, and the chemist William Crookes.

Theosophy also exerted an influence on the arts, and was especially formative for many early pioneers of abstract art. Hilma af Klint's development of abstraction was directly tied to her work with the Theosophical Society, with the aim of presenting and preserving spiritual concepts visually. The same was true for the Russian expressionist and pioneering abstract painter Wassily Kandinsky, who was interested in Theosophy and Theosophical ideas about colour. The Dutch abstract artist Piet Mondrian was also influenced by Theosophical symbolism.

Theosophical ideas were also an influence on the Irish literary movement of the late 19th and early 20th century, with writers such as Charles Johnston, George Russell, John Eglinton, Charles Weeks, and William Butler Yeats having an interest in the movement. The American adventure fiction writer Talbot Mundy included Theosophical themes in many of his works. He had abandoned his previous allegiance to Christian Science to join the Theosophical faction led by Tingley, joining the Society in 1923 and settling at the Point Loma community.

The turn-of-the-20th century Russian composer Alexander Scriabin, whose metaphysical and mystical views greatly influenced his tonal system and compositional output, became interested in Theosophy while living in Brussels from 1909–10. Other composers whose music was influenced by theosophical concerns include Gustav Holst, Luigi Russolo, Cyril Scott and Edmund Rubbra.

Mark Frost cites Theosophy as a direct influence in the writing and creation of the television series Twin Peaks, which itself includes a 'white lodge'.

The character Obadiah Archer from the Valiant Comics universe series "Archer & Armstrong" draws his abilities from Theosophic belief, and the series makes multiple references to Theosophy, Anthroposophy, Völkisch movement and other esoteric schools of thought that believe in the Akashic Plane. The series also ties in the Fascist history of these groups, with a group of connected Nazis living in Tibet. Obadiah Archer is implied to be one of the ascended masters in the Theosophy tradition.

=== Influence on other religious and esoteric groups ===
Bestsellers and television shows are devoted to Theosophical concepts such as reincarnation and spiritual evolution; the Internet overflows with references to Theosophical concepts such as the human aura (a Google search in May 2012 retrieved 47 million hits) and the chakras (12 million hits). Even truly mainstream media such as the National Geographic Channel present programs devoted to arch-Theosophical themes such as Atlantis, and the spiritual mysteries of Egypt. Terms and ideas created or mediated by spokespersons of the Theosophical Society have over time become household words, and the advent of Theosophy thus marked a fundamental change in the religious lives of countless individuals.

— Olav Hammer and Mikael Rothstein, 2013

The founders of many later new religious movements had been involved in Theosophy. Many esoteric groups—such as Alice Bailey's Arcane School and Rudolf Steiner's Anthroposophy—are "directly dependent" on Theosophy. Although he had split from Theosophy when renouncing Leadbeater's statement that he was the World Teacher, Krishnamurti continued to exhibit Theosophical influences in his later teachings. In 1923 a former Theosophist, the Anglo-American Alice Bailey, established the Arcane School, which also rested on beliefs regarding contact with the Ascended Masters.

Another former Theosophist, the Austrian Rudolf Steiner, split from the Theosophical Society over the statements about Krishnamurti and then established his own Anthroposophical Society in 1913, which promoted Anthroposophy, a philosophy influenced by Theosophical ideas. Rudolf Steiner founded the Anthroposophical Society on 28 December 1912 and he was expelled from the Theosophical Society on 7 March 1913. Despite his departure from the Theosophists, Rudolf Steiner nevertheless maintained a keen interest in Theosophy for the rest of his life.

As Theosophy entered the Völkisch movement of late 19th century Austria and Germany, it syncretized to form an eclectic occult movement known as Ariosophy. The most prominent Ariosophist, the Austrian Guido von List, was influenced by Theosophical ideas in creating his own occult system.

In the United States during the 1930s, the I AM group was established by Guy Ballard and Edna Ballard; the group adopted the idea of the Ascended Masters from Theosophy. The idea of the Masters—and a belief in Morya and Kuthumi—have also been adopted into the belief system of the Church Universal and Triumphant. The Canadian mystic Manly P. Hall also cited Blavatsky's writings as a key influence on his ideas. Theosophical ideas, including on the evolution of the Earth, influenced the teachings of British conspiracist David Icke.

Hammer and Rothstein stated that Theosophy came to heavily influence "popular religiosity" and by the late twentieth and twenty-first centuries was "permeating just about every nook and cranny of contemporary "folk" religious culture" in Western countries. It was a major influence on the New Age milieu of the latter twentieth century. It played an important role in promoting belief in reincarnation among Westerners.

=== Scholarly research ===
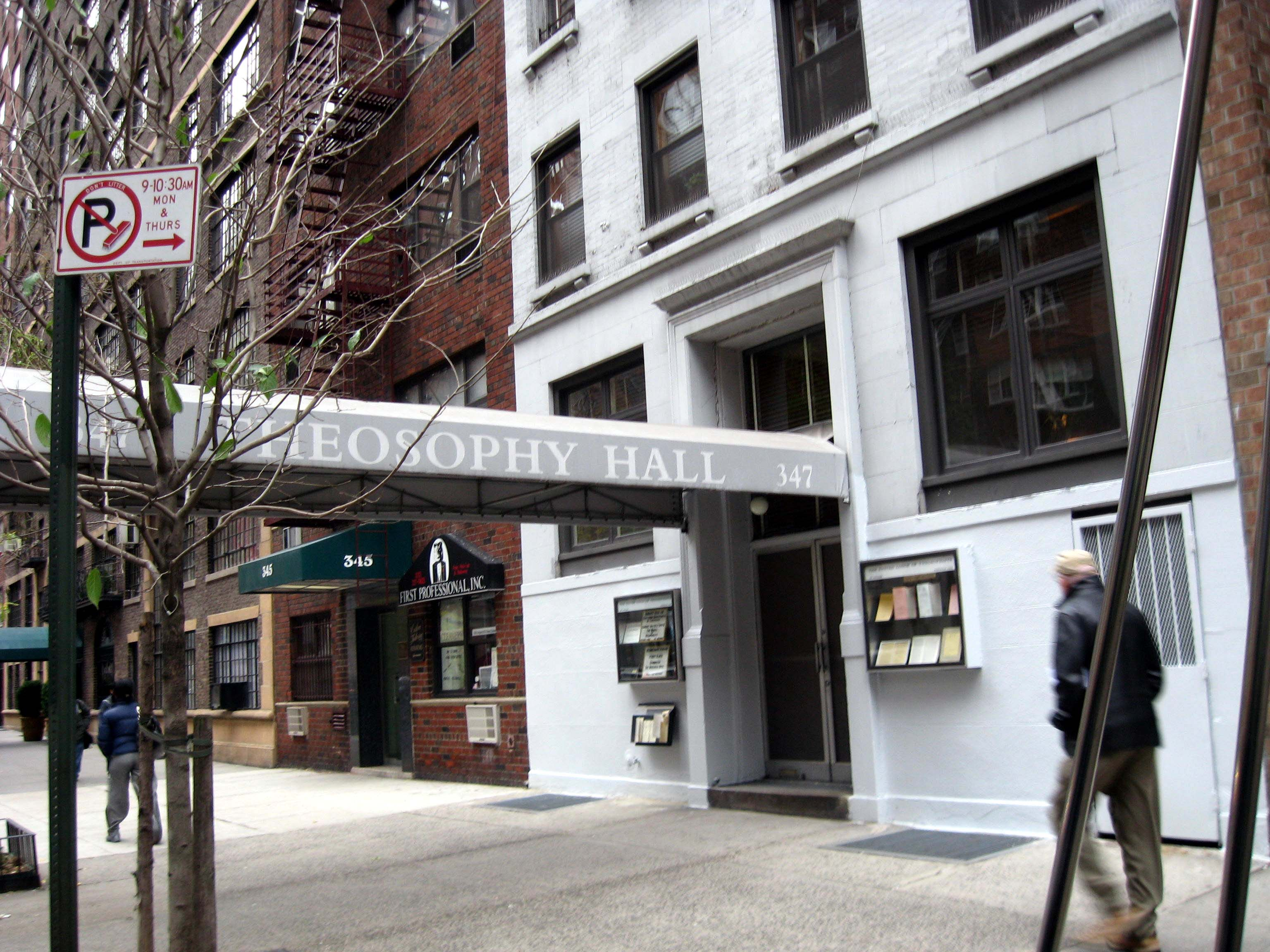
Theosophy Hall in Manhattan, New York City

A considerable amount of literature has been produced on the subject of Theosophy and the Theosophical Society. Most early publications on Theosophy fell into two camps: either apologetic and highly defensive, or highly antagonistic and aggressive towards the movement. As of 2001, the scholar of religion Olav Hammer could still note that books presenting the Theosophical doctrines were mostly apologetic in nature. Examples of such works include William Q. Judge's 1893 book Ocean of Theosophy and Robert Ellwood's 1986 book Theosophy. He noted that most of these works treated Theosophical doctrine as if it were a fixed entity and provided little or no discussion of how they have changed over the decades. Many articles on the historical development of the movement have also appeared in the journal Theosophical History.

Many early scholars of religion dismissed Theosophy as being not worthy of study; Mircea Eliade for instance described Theosophy as a "detestable 'spiritual' hybridism". The academic study of the Theosophical current developed at the intersection of two scholarly sub-fields: the study of new religious movements, which emerged in the 1970s, and the study of Western esotericism. For example, Blavatsky Unveiled Volume 1 by theosophical scholar Moon Laramie provides a modern translation and dispassionate analysis of the first seven chapters of Isis Unveiled.

A significant proportion of the scholarship on Theosophy constitutes biographies of its leading members and discussions of events in the Society's history. In contrast to the significant amount of research focused on the first two generations of Theosophists, little has been produced on later figures. Hammer also lamented that while scholarship on Theosophy was developing, it had not focused on the reformulation of Theosophy by Leadbeater and Besant or with the developing ideas of post-Theosophical writers such as Steiner or Bailey. Hammer and Rothstein suggested that the "dearth of scholarly literature" on Theosophy was because "powerful individuals and institutions" in Europe and North America regarded the religion as "ludicrous", thus discouraging scholars from devoting their time to researching it.

== See also ==
- Agni Yoga
- Benjamin Creme
- Hinduism and Theosophy
- Neo-Theosophy
- Helena Roerich
- Nicholas Roerich
- Victor Skumin
- New religious movement
- Theosophy and literature
- Theosophy and visual arts
- Theosophical Society Adyar
- Theosophical Society in America
- Perennialism

== Sources ==
=== Bibliography ===
- Åkerman, Susanna (1998). Rose Cross Over the Baltic: The Spread of Rosicrucianism in Northern Europe. Brill. ISBN 9004110305.
- Campbell, Bruce F. (1980). Ancient Wisdom Revived: A History of the Theosophical Movement. Berkeley: University of California Press. ISBN 978-0520039681.
- Carlson, Maria (1993). No Religion Higher than Truth: A History of the Theosophical Movement in Russia, 1875–1922. Princeton, NJ: Princeton University Press. ISBN 978-0691636337.
- Chajes, Julie (2017). "Reincarnation in H.P. Blavatsky's The Secret Doctrine". Correspondences: An Online Journal for the Academic Study of Western Esotericism. 5: 65–93.
- Dixon, Joy (2001). Divine Feminine: Theosophy and Feminism in England. The Johns Hopkins University Studies in Historical and Political Science. Baltimore and London: Johns Hopkins University Press. ISBN 0-8018-6499-2.
- Faivre, Antoine (1994). Access to Western Esotericism. SUNY Series in Western Esoteric Traditions. Albany, NY: State University of New York Press.
- Faivre, Antoine (2000). Theosophy, Imagination, Tradition: Studies in Western Esotericism. SUNY Press. p. 12. ISBN 9780791444368.
- Franklin, J. Jeffrey (2018). Spirit Matters: Occult Beliefs, Alternative Religions, and the Crisis of Faith in Victorian Britain. Ithaca and London: Cornell University Press. ISBN 9781501715440.
- Gardell, Mattias (2003). Gods of the Blood: The Pagan Revival and White Separatism. Durham and London: Duke University Press. ISBN 978-0-8223-3071-4.
- Godwin, Joscelyn (1994). The Theosophical Enlightenment. Albany: State University of New York Press. ISBN 978-0791421512.
- Godwin, Joscelyn (1994b). "Foreword". In K. Paul Johnson (ed.). The Masters Revealed: Madame Blavatsky and the Myth of the Great White Lodge. Albany: State University of New York Press. pp. xv–xix. ISBN 978-0791420645.
- Goodrick-Clarke, Nicholas (2004). Helena Blavatsky. Berkeley: North Atlantic Books. ISBN 978-1-55643-457-0.
- Goodrick-Clarke, Nicholas (2008). The Western Esoteric Traditions: A Historical Introduction. Oxford: Oxford University Press. ISBN 978-0195320992.
- Hammer, Olav (2001). Claiming Knowledge: Strategies of Epistemology from Theosophy to the New Age. Leiden and Boston: Brill. ISBN 978-90-04-13638-0.
- Hammer, Olav; Rothstein, Mikael (2013). "Introduction". In Olav Hammer; Mikael Rothstein (eds.). Handbook of the Theosophical Current. Brill Handbooks on Contemporary Religion. Leiden: Brill. pp. 1–12. ISBN 978-90-04-23596-0.
- Hanegraaff, Wouter (2013). Western Esotericism: A Guide for the Perplexed. London: Bloomsbury Press. ISBN 978-1441136466.
- Introvigne, Massimo (2018). "Painting the Masters in Britain: From Schmiechen to Scott". In Christine Ferguson; Andrew Radford (eds.). The Occult Imagination in Britain: 1875–1947. Abingdon and New York: Routledge. pp. 206–226. ISBN 978-1-4724-8698-1.
- Johnson, K. Paul (1994). The Masters Revealed: Madame Blavatsky and the Myth of the Great White Lodge. Albany: State University of New York Press. ISBN 978-0791420645.
- Johnston, Jay (2012). "Theosophical Bodies: Colour, Shape, and Emotion from Modern Aesthetics to Healing Therapies". In Cusack, Carol; Norman, Alex (eds.). Handbook of New Religions and Cultural Production. Brill Handbooks on Contemporary Religion. Vol. 4. Leiden: Brill Publishers. pp. 153–170. doi:10.1163/9789004226487_008. ISBN 978-90-04-22187-1. ISSN 1874-6691.
- Lachman, Gary (2012). Madame Blavatsky: The Mother of Modern Spirituality. New York: Jeremy P. Tarcher/Penguin. ISBN 978-1-58542-863-2.
- Laramie, Moon (2020). Blavatsky Unveiled: The Writings of H.P. Blavatsky in modern English. Volume I. London: Martin Firrell Company Ltd. ISBN 978-0993178696.
- Lowry, Elizabeth (2019). "These Lovers are Out of this World: Sex, Consent, and the Rhetoric of Conversion in Abductee Narratives". In Darryl Caterine; John W. Morehead (eds.). The Paranormal and Popular Culture: A Postmodern Religious Landscape. London and New York: Routledge. pp. 68–77. ISBN 978-1-138-73857-7.
- Meade, Marion (1980). Madame Blavatsky: The Woman Behind the Myth. New York: Putnam. ISBN 978-0-399-12376-4.
- Partridge, Christopher (2004). The Re-Enchantment of the West Volume. 1: Alternative Spiritualities, Sacralization, Popular Culture, and Occulture. London: T&T Clark International. ISBN 978-0567084088.
- Partridge, Christopher (2013). "Lost Horizon: H. P. Blavatsky and Theosophical Orientalism". In Olav Hammer; Mikael Rothstein (eds.). Handbook of the Theosophical Current. Brill Handbooks on Contemporary Religion. Leiden: Brill. pp. 309–333. ISBN 978-90-04-23596-0.
- Poller, Jake (2018). ""Under a Glamour": Annie Besant, Charles Leadbeater and Neo-Theosophy". In Christine Ferguson; Andrew Radford (eds.). The Occult Imagination in Britain: 1875–1947. Abingdon and New York: Routledge. pp. 77–93. ISBN 978-1-4724-8698-1.
- Robertson, David G. (2016). UFOs, Conspiracy Theories and the New Age: Millennial Conspiracism. London and New York: Bloomsbury Academic. ISBN 978-1-350-04498-2.
- Santucci, James A. (2006). "Theosophical Society". In Wouter Hanegraaff (ed.). Dictionary of Gnosis and Western Esotericism. Leiden: Brill. pp. 1114–1123. ISBN 978-90-04-15231-1.
- Santucci, James A. (2012). "Theosophy". In Olav Hammer; Mikael Rothstein (eds.). The Cambridge Companion to New Religious Movements. Cambridge: Cambridge University Press. pp. 231–246. ISBN 978-0521145657.
- Shaw, Michael (2018). "Theosophy in Scotland: Oriental Occultism and National Identity". In Christine Ferguson; Andrew Radford (eds.). The Occult Imagination in Britain: 1875–1947. Abingdon and New York: Routledge. pp. 23–40. ISBN 978-1-4724-8698-1.
- Taves, Brian (1985). "Philosophy Into Popular Fiction: Talbot Mundy and The Theosophical Society". Southern California Quarterly. 67 (2): 153–186. doi:10.2307/41171147. JSTOR 41171147.
- Trompf, Garry W.; Bernauer, Lauren (2012). "Producing Lost Civilisations: Theosophical Concepts in Literature, Visual Media, and Popular Culture". In Cusack, Carol; Norman, Alex (eds.). Handbook of New Religions and Cultural Production. Brill Handbooks on Contemporary Religion. Vol. 4. Leiden: Brill Publishers. pp. 99–131. doi:10.1163/9789004226487_006. ISBN 978-90-04-22187-1. ISSN 1874-6691.
- Washington, Peter (1993). Madame Blavatsky's Baboon: Theosophy and the Emergence of the Western Guru. London: Secker & Warburg. ISBN 978-0-436-56418-5.
