= Katherine Tingley =

American prominent theosophist and social worker

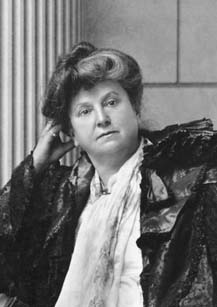
- Katherine Tingley
- Born: Katherine Augusta Westcott; July 6, 1847; Newbury, Massachusetts, US
- Died: July 11, 1929 (aged 82); Visingsö, Sweden
- Predecessor: William Quan Judge
- Successor: Gottfried de Purucker

Katherine Augusta Westcott Tingley (July 6, 1847 – July 11, 1929) was a social worker and prominent theosophist. She led the American Section of the Theosophical Society after W. Q. Judge. She founded and led the Theosophical community Lomaland in Point Loma, San Diego.

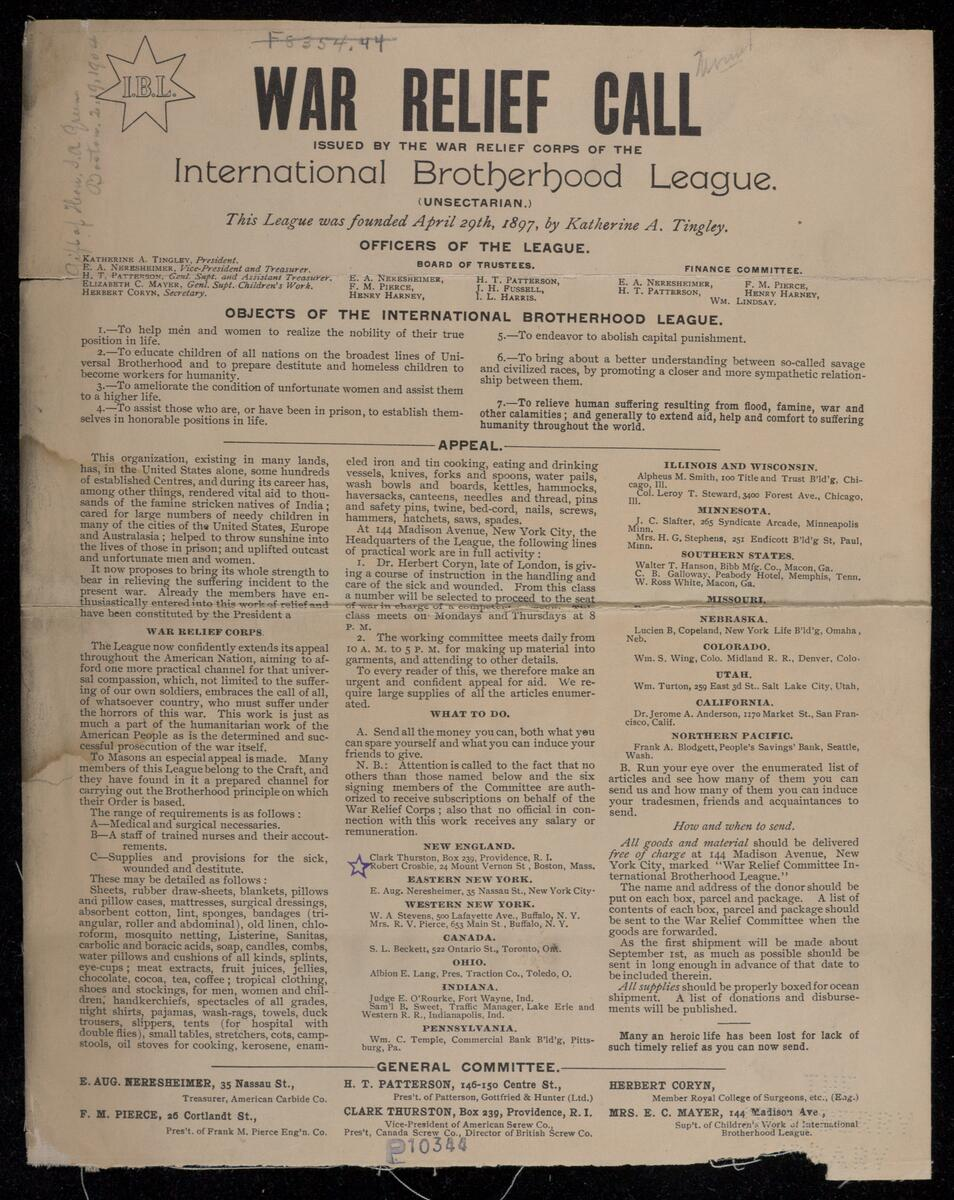
IBL broadside requesting funds and supplies for war relief in aftermath of Spanish-American War

== Early life ==
Tingley was born in Newburyport, Massachusetts, on July 6, 1847, the daughter of James P. and Susan Westcott, of early colonial ancestry.

== Career ==
Tingley was employed as a social worker in New York City when she met William Quan Judge. She joined the Theosophical Society on October 13, 1894.

In 1895, disputes between Judge and Annie Besant led to a split, with Judge taking most of the American section with him. After converting Tingley to Theosophy, Judge appointed her as the Outer Head of the Theosophical Society. became the new head of the Universal Brotherhood and Theosophical Society, although her identity was concealed for one year. In 1898, a group of roughly 200 theosophists led by Ernest Temple Hargrove seceded from Tingley's organization, and formed a rival group based in New York City.

Tingley conducted two theosophical crusades around the world. She was the founder of the International Brotherhood League, and also of the Summer Home for Children, Spring Valley, New Jersey, of a home for orphan children in Point Loma, California, and of several academies for boys and girls in Cuba. She did relief and emergency hospital work after the Spanish–American War and was instrumental in establishing hospitals in Manila and Cuba.

On February 13, 1900, she transferred the Society's international headquarters from New York City to a new colony she called Lomaland, located in the Point Loma community near San Diego, California. Her settlement included Raja-Yoga School and College, Theosophical University, and the School for the Revival of the Lost Mysteries of Antiquity.

In 1901, the Los Angeles Times printed a story entitled Outrages at Point Loma; Exposed by an ‘Escape’ from Tingley. Startling Tales told in this City. Women and Children Starved and Treated Like Convicts. Thrilling Rescue. It made various claims against Tingley, and she immediately filed a lawsuit against the paper for libel. She won the following year, resulting in other papers being much more reluctant to attack her publicly.

In 1913 she founded the Parliament of Peace and Universal Brotherhood and in 1919 the Theosophical University at Point Loma. She established several theosophical branch centers in America and in Europe, and also a summer school for children at Visingsö, Sweden. She was the editor of the Theosophical Path. Many theosophical magazines were published under her direction in Germany, the Netherlands, and Sweden. She was the author of "Theosophy and Some of the Vital Problems of the Day," "Marriage and the Home," "Theosophy, the Path of the Mystic."

In 1909, Tingley purchased a tract of land which included the San Juan Heights battlefield, the location of the charge made by American troops including Theodore Roosevelt and his Rough Riders. It is considered a historic site in Cuba pertaining to the Spanish-American War. On that same site, she designed a memorial archway at the entrance to the property to honor those who had died.

== Personal life ==
In 1888 she married Philo B. Tingley, inventor, and lived at Point Loma, California.

== Legacy ==
After her death, her successors transferred the society to Covina, California and then to Pasadena, where it currently exists.

== Literature ==
Sievers, Martin: Purpurkvinnan. Historien om Katherine Tingley och teosoferna på Visingsö, 2013. ISBN 978-91-637-2038-3 (in Swedish)

Hall, Jill G.: On A Sundown Sea, 2025. ISBN 978-1-64742-988-1 (historical novel based on Katherine Tingley)

== See also ==
- Point Loma Nazarene University
- Battle of San Juan Hill
