= William Quan Judge =

Irish-American Theosophist (1851–1896)

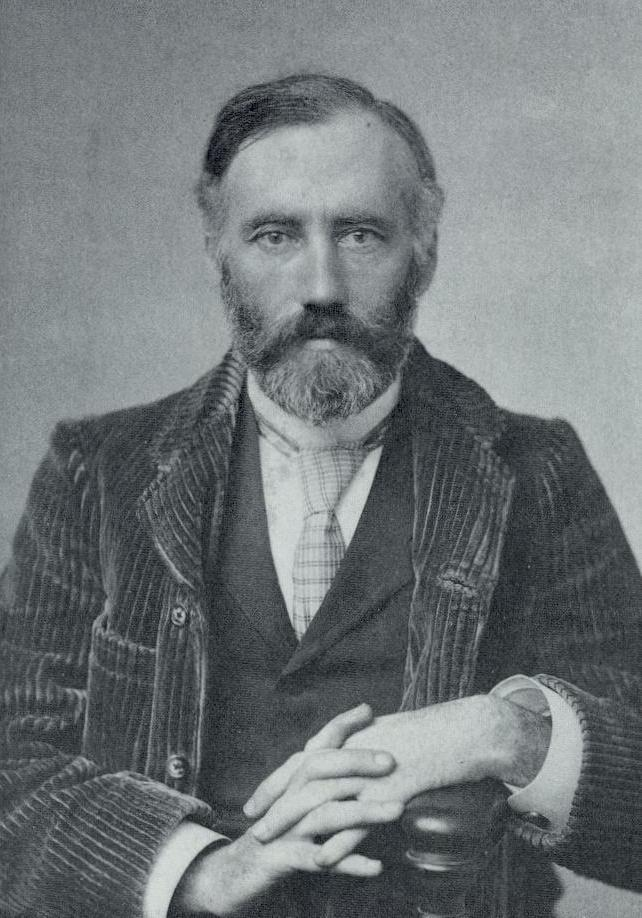
- Born: 13 April 1851; Dublin, Ireland
- Died: 21 March 1896 (aged 44); New York City, United States
- Occupations: Lawyer, writer
- Known for: Co-founding the Theosophical Society

William Quan Judge (13 April 1851 – 21 March 1896) was an Irish-born American lawyer, writer, and Theosophist. He co-founded the Theosophical Society with Helena Blavatsky and Henry Steel Olcott in 1875 and subsequently led its work in the United States.

Judge founded the journal The Path in 1886 and wrote The Ocean of Theosophy (1893). Following disputes with Olcott and Annie Besant over communications attributed to the Mahatmas, most American members separated from the international society in 1895. Judge became president of the independent Theosophical Society in America and held that position until his death in 1896.

== Early life and legal career ==
Judge was born in Dublin on 13 April 1851. His family emigrated to New York in 1864 and settled in Brooklyn. He studied law while working in the office of George P. Andrews, became a naturalized American citizen in April 1872, and was admitted to the New York bar the following month. His practice specialized in commercial law. In 1874 he married Ella M. Smith, a schoolteacher; their daughter died in infancy.

== Theosophical Society ==
The Theosophical Society was founded in New York City in 1875 by Judge, Helena Blavatsky, Henry Steel Olcott, and other participants in discussions of Spiritualism and religion. After Blavatsky and Olcott left for India in 1878, the American movement declined. Judge worked to rebuild it through public meetings, lectures, and publications. He visited Blavatsky in Paris and traveled to India in 1884. He became general secretary of the society's American Section in 1886 and vice president of the international society in 1890.

Judge launched The Path, a monthly Theosophical journal, in 1886. It appeared through 1896 and provided a forum for his writing and efforts to recruit members. He also published introductions to Theosophical ideas and adaptations of Indian religious texts, including The Ocean of Theosophy, a version of the Yoga Sutras of Patanjali, and material on the Bhagavad Gita.

=== Leadership dispute and separation ===
After Blavatsky's death in 1891, Judge's relationship with Olcott and Besant deteriorated. The dispute concerned communications attributed to the Mahatmas, whom Theosophists regarded as spiritual teachers. Besant and Olcott accused Judge of misusing the Mahatmas' names and handwriting. Judge opposed an institutional trial, arguing that it would require the society to adopt a position on the existence of the Mahatmas. He retained his vice presidency after proceedings in July 1894, but the dispute continued.

At the American Section's convention in 1895, most American members and branches broke with the international society. The independent organization adopted the name Theosophical Society in America and elected Judge president for life.

== Death and succession ==
Judge died in New York City on 21 March 1896. Katherine Tingley emerged as his successor with the support of members of his leadership circle. A convention of her supporters ratified her leadership in 1898, when the organization adopted the name Universal Brotherhood and Theosophical Society.

== Selected works ==
Judge's publications included:

- The Yoga Aphorisms of Patanjali (1889)
- Echoes of the Orient (1890)
- The Bhagavad Gita: The Book of Devotion (1890)
- Letters That Have Helped Me (1891), compiled by Jasper Niemand
- The Ocean of Theosophy (1893)
