= Bill's Bus =

Private bus service in Santa Barbara, California, United States

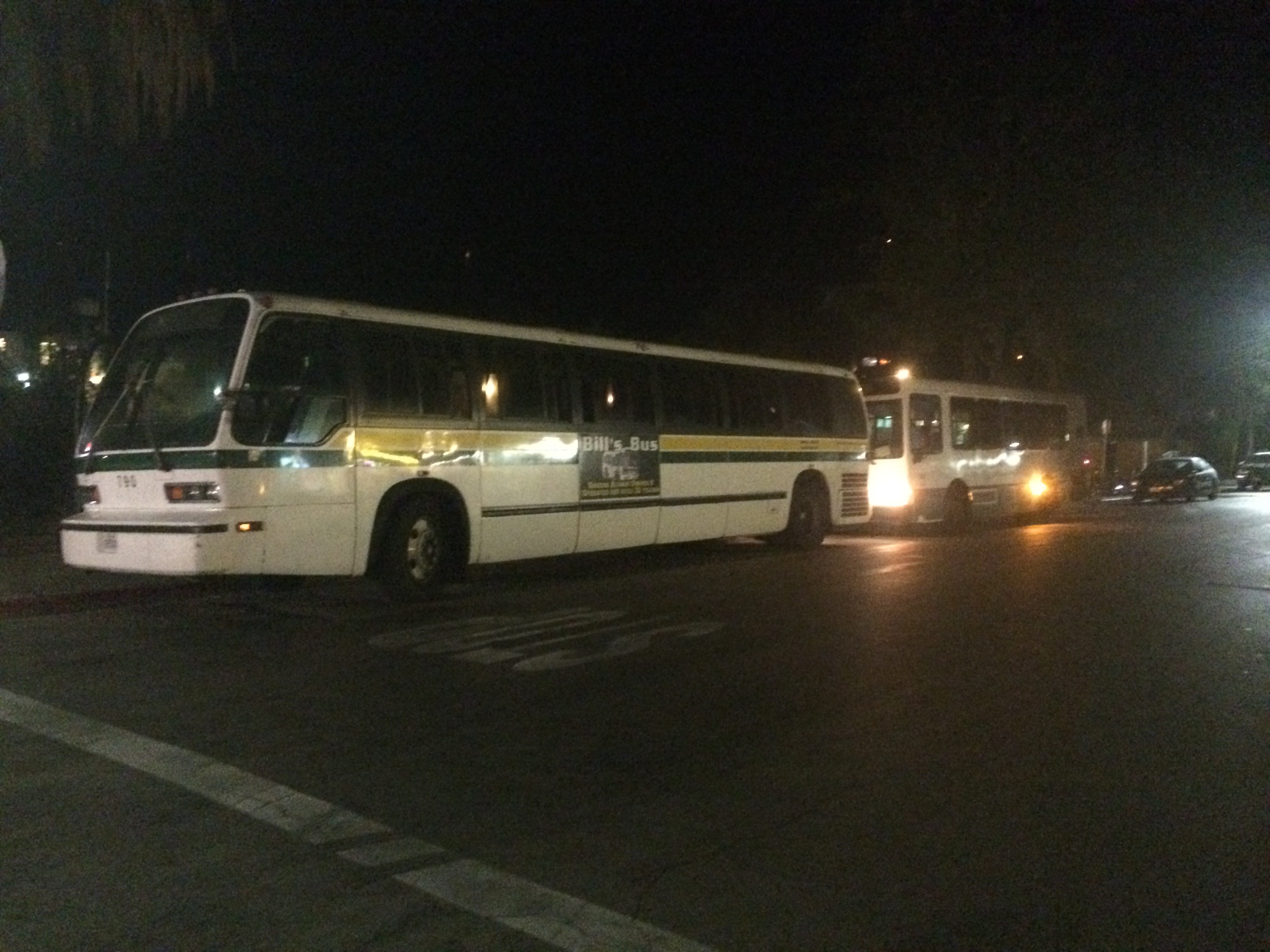
Two of the buses in Isla Vista.

Bill's Bus is a privately owned commercial bus service that runs from Isla Vista, California to Goleta and Santa Barbara bars, picking up and dropping off college students. As an effort to prevent drunk driving, rides have sometimes been sponsored by local bars and UC Santa Barbara's Associated Students. It is popular among students, with multiple buses running on Thursdays and other busy nights.

== History ==
William J. Singer founded Bill's Bus in 1991, when he was 19 years old. In 2002 the service was briefly suspended, and in a related news article, Singer said "There’s no money in it...I’m trying to do something that will make a difference." The business faced financial trouble in 2003, and in 2004 Singer sold it to Craig Jenkins, owner of the Velvet Jones bar in downtown Santa Barbara.

Due to the COVID-19 pandemic, the service stopped operating in March 2020. Faced with an increase to their insurance premiums, the company organized a GoFundMe to stay in operation.

== Attempted San Diego project ==
Singer started a separate, short-lived service in San Diego called Bill's Bus, which went between Pacific Beach and downtown. That service is no longer in operation as of 2009.
