= Rosecroft (San Diego) =

- U.S. National Register of Historic Places
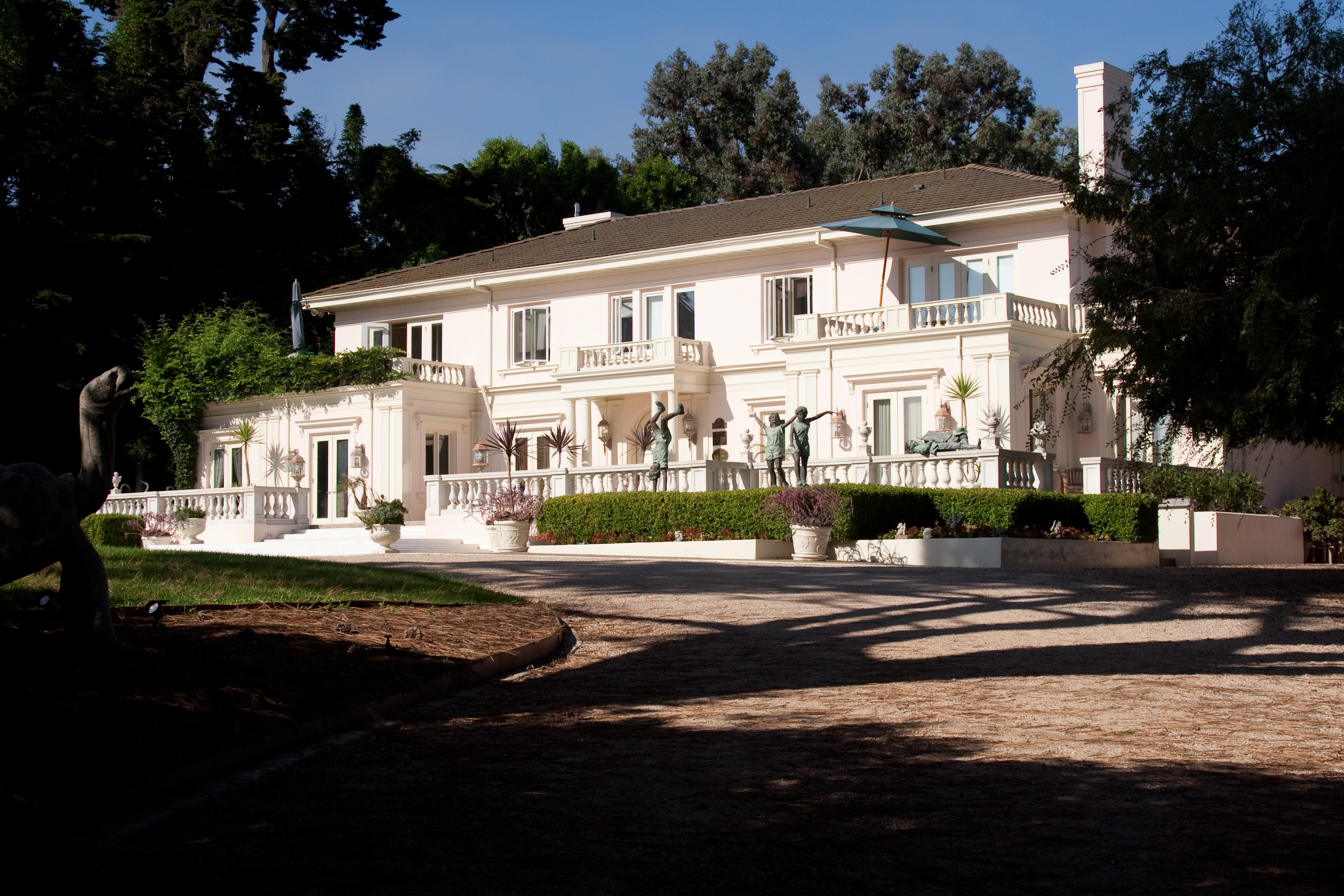
- Rosecroft

- Location within San Diego Location within San Diego County, California Location within California Location within the United States
- Location: 530 Silvergate Ave., San Diego, California
- Coordinates: 32°41′51″N 117°14′44″W
- Area: 2.4 acres (0.97 ha)
- Built: 1912
- Architect: Emmor Brooke Weaver
- Architectural style: Italian Renaissance
- NRHP reference No.: 03000472
- Added to NRHP: September 22, 2003

Rosecroft is a historic estate and gardens in the Point Loma neighborhood of San Diego, California. It was built in 1912 by architect Emmor Brooke Weaver for wealthy heiress Marion James Robinson, née Marion James Duncan (1873-1918), and her husband Alfred D. Robinson (1866-1942), a retired medical instrument merchant. Rosecroft is listed on the National Register of Historic Places.

The 15,000 ft^{2} (1,400 m^{2}), Italian Renaissance–style mansion, located on Silvergate Avenue in the Wooded Area of Point Loma, sits on 2.5 acres (1.0 ha) and is considered the largest parcel in the area. The property was originally 10 acres (4.0 ha) of barley fields. The Robinsons bought the property in 1903 after becoming interested in the ideas of Theosophist Katherine Tingley, who was developing a utopian community "Lomaland" in the Point Loma area. They developed the fields into half a city block of gardens, where they cultivated various ornamental plants, particularly begonias. Marion named the property "Rosecroft" in recognition of her Scottish Highland ancestry.

Marion and Alfred were co-founders, along with Kate Sessions, of the San Diego Floral Association, and Alfred was the association's first president, as well as the editor of its magazine, California Garden. Alfred, a self-taught horticulturist, began by experimenting with roses and dahlias, but eventually came to focus on begonias. He became "the pre-eminent begonia expert", developing more than 100 new varieties at the Rosecroft estate. Alfred's were judged "the finest begonias to be grown anywhere in the world" by plant explorer and botanist David Fairchild.

After his death in 1942, a new owner opened the garden to the public as Rosecroft Begonia Gardens; the gardens were a popular tourist attraction through the 1960s. In the 1970s the property was sold and the garden area subdivided for residential use. Today the home is a private residence, marked by a National Register plaque. Several private residences occupy the former site of the Rosecroft Begonia Gardens; a stone wall along Silvergate Avenue is the only reminder of that attraction.

The mansion, Rosecroft, was added to the National Register of Historic Places by the National Park Service on September 22, 2003. It has been the scene of some notable events including Ronald Reagan's announcement of his candidacy to be governor of California (1966) and the 80th birthday party of Theodor Seuss Geisel ("Dr. Seuss") (1984). Notable guests at the mansion included Jimmy and Rosalynn Carter, who spent the weekend there during a Habitat for Humanity fundraiser, and winemaker Robert Mondavi, who spent so much time there that a suite was named for him.

The estate is periodically opened to charity events, garden tours, weddings, film shoots, and other special events. In 2012, the 100th anniversary of the estate and gardens was commemorated by a tour organized by the San Diego Floral Association, which included the debut of a new variety of geranium named for Anna Gunn Marston, wife of George Marston, a contemporary of Robinson. Charity fundraisers that year included a "Great Gatsby" themed event held by the philanthropic organization Makua to benefit the charity Voices for Children.
