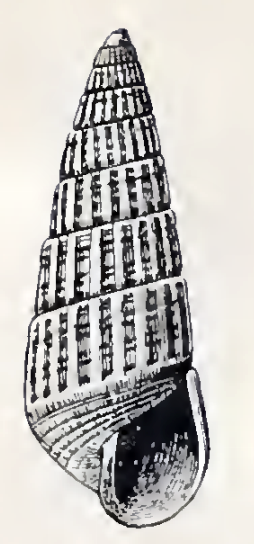
- Drawing of a shell of Turbonilla obesa

Scientific classification
- Kingdom: Animalia
- Phylum: Mollusca
- Class: Gastropoda
- Family: Pyramidellidae
- Genus: Turbonilla
- Species: T. obesa

Binomial name
- Turbonilla obesa Dall & Bartsch, 1909

Synonyms
- Turbonilla (Pyrgiscus) obesa Dall & Bartsch, 1909

= Turbonilla obesa =

Species of gastropod

Turbonilla obesa is a species of sea snail, a marine gastropod mollusk in the family Pyramidellidae, the pyrams and their allies.

== Description ==
The robust shell has a chocolate brown color. Its length measures 5.2 mm. The whorls of the protoconch are small and deeply obliquely immersed in the first turn of the teleoconch, above which only the tilted edge of the last one projects. The eight whorls of the teleoconch are flattened and moderately shouldered at the summit. They are marked by strong vertical axial ribs, which are decidedly contracted at their junctions with the spiral grooves, which lends them a somewhat nodulous aspect. Of these ribs, 16 appear on the first, 18 on the second, 20 upon the third to fifth, 22 on the sixth, and 24 on the penultimate turn. The intercostal spaces are about as broad as the ribs. They are crossed by five strongly incised spiral grooves which almost cross the ribs. One of these is at the periphery. The remaining four appear in a double series; the one placed about as far below the summit as the other is above the periphery, the space between them being wider than that between the summit and the first pit below it. Two fine incised spiral lines mark the space between the summit and the first series of pits below it. The periphery of the body whorl is marked by a broad plain band, well rounded. The base of the shell is very short and well rounded. It is marked by about six unequal and unequally spaced strong incised lines. The aperture is pear-shaped. The posterior angle is acute. The outer lip is thin, showing the external sculpture within. The columella is oblique, slightly revolute and provided with a moderately strong fold at its insertion.

== Distribution ==
The type specimen was collected in the Pacific Ocean at Pacific Beach, California, USA.
