= Kate Sessions Memorial Park =

Park in San Diego, California, U.S.

- Location within San Diego Location within California Location within the United States
- Type: Urban park
- Location: San Diego, California, U.S.
- Coordinates: 32.811°N 117.238°W
- Area: 79-acre park
- Owner: City of San Diego

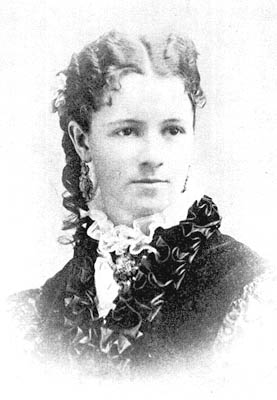
Kate Sessions, San Diego's botanist, park's namesake

Kate Sessions Memorial Park is a public park in San Diego, California, situated at the base of Mount Soledad. It hosts walking trails, picnic tables, barbecues, natural habitat, restrooms, a seasonal creek, a playground and dog friendly spaces. It provides panoramic views of the Pacific Ocean, Pacific Beach, Mission Bay, Mission Beach, Ocean Beach, downtown San Diego, and glimpses of San Diego Bay and Coronado.

The park is dedicated to Kate Sessions, a botanist, horticulturalist, and landscape architect who lived and worked in San Diego from 1884-1940. Sessions started as school teacher and worked in a flower shop before becoming one of San Diego's leading botanists and the "Mother of Balboa Park". Close to the park, there is a California Historical Landmark No. 764 (listed on April 28, 1961) at the corner of Garnet Avenue and Pico Street, where Sessions ran her plant nursery.

== History ==
In 1933, Sessions and local residents submitted a petition to the City of San Diego that requested a two-acre local park be established in Pacific Beach, named "Color Park" for the bright colored flowers planned at the site. The petition was approved, and the park was established with white matilija poppies, red bougainvillea, and ever-blooming blue plumages, along with native oak trees and evergreen shrubs.

Sessions died in 1940, and the park was expanded and re-named "Soledad Terrace Park" in 1948 after nearby lots and parcels were combined with the original site. In 1957, the park was formally renamed "Kate Sessions Memorial Park" in celebration of the 100th anniversary of her birthday.

== See also ==
- List of parks in San Diego
