= Point Loma, San Diego =

Community within San Diego in California

Point Loma
- Community
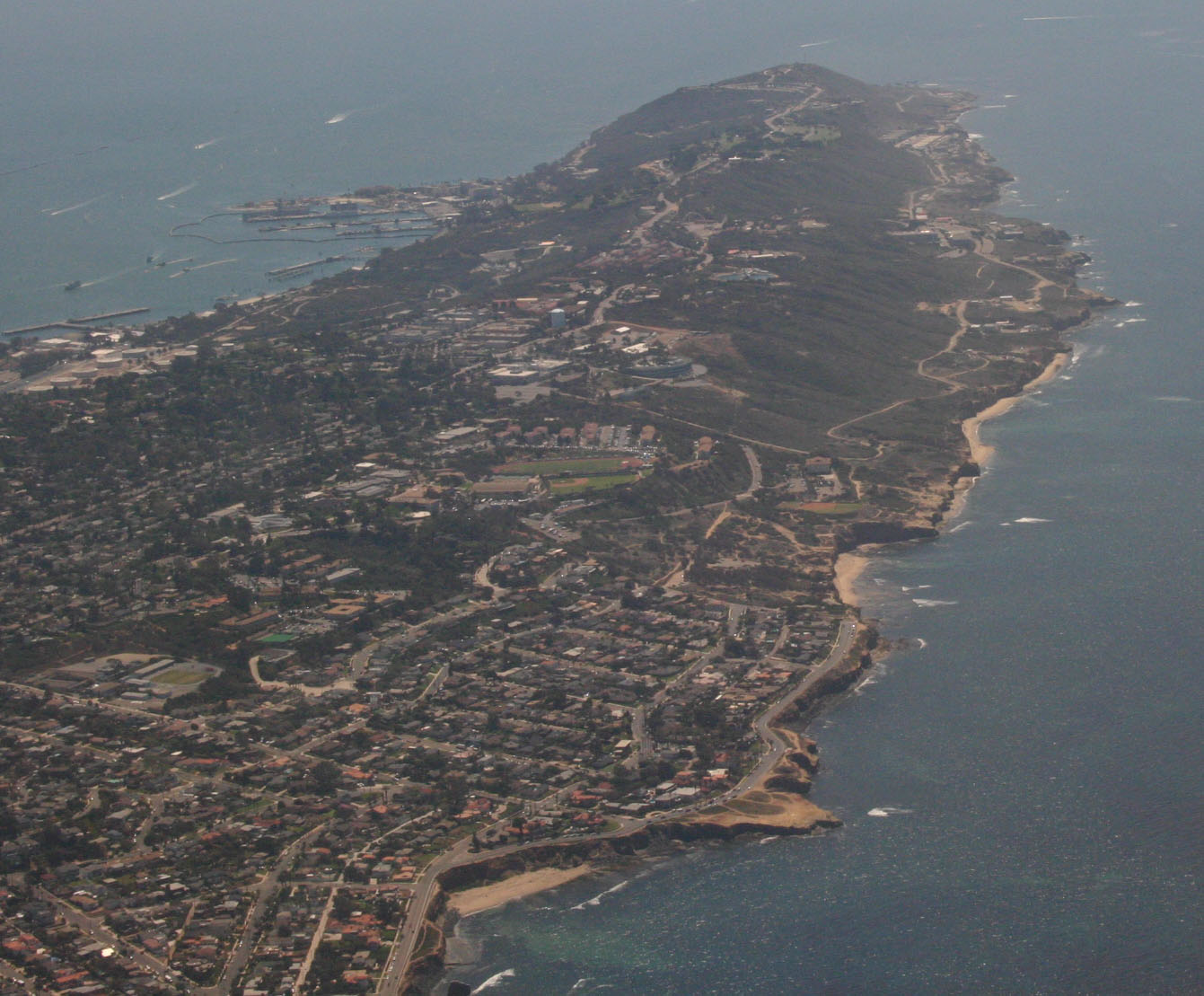
- Aerial view of Point Loma, facing south, March 2007

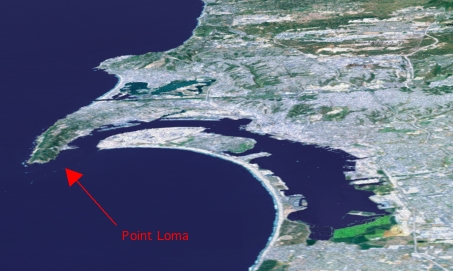
- The Point Loma peninsula at left
- Coordinates: 32°40′12″N 117°14′31″W
- Country: United States of America
- State: California
- County: San Diego
- City: San Diego
- ZIP Codes: 92106 and 92107

Point Loma (Spanish: Punta de la Loma, meaning "Hill Point"; Kumeyaay: Amat Kunyily, meaning "Black Earth") is a seaside community in San Diego, California, United States. Geographically it is a hilly peninsula that is bordered on the west and south by the Pacific Ocean, the east by San Diego Bay and Old Town, and the north by the San Diego River. Together with the Silver Strand/Coronado peninsula, the Point Loma peninsula defines San Diego Bay and separates it from the Pacific Ocean. The term "Point Loma" is used to describe both the neighborhood and the peninsula.

Point Loma has an estimated population of 47,981 (including Ocean Beach), according to the 2010 Census. The Peninsula Planning Area, which includes most of Point Loma, comprises approximately 4,400 acres (1,800 ha).

Point Loma is historically important as the landing place of the first European expedition to come ashore in present-day California. It houses two major military bases, a national cemetery, a national monument, and a university, in addition to residential and commercial areas.

== History ==
Portuguese explorer Juan Rodríguez Cabrillo claiming California for the Spanish Empire in 1542.

Loma is the Spanish word for hill. The original Spanish name of the peninsula was La Punta de la Loma de San Diego, translated as Hill Point of San Diego. This was later anglicized to Point Loma. The original Kumeyaay name was 'Amat Kunyily' meaning "black earth".

There were no permanent indigenous settlements on Point Loma because of a lack of fresh water. Kumeyaay people did probably have a seasonal village remembered by them as Totakamalam and visited Ocean Beach periodically to harvest mussels, clams, abalone and lobsters.

Point Loma was discovered by Europeans on September 28, 1542, when Portuguese navigator Juan Rodríguez Cabrillo (João Rodrigues Cabrilho in Portuguese) departed from Mexico and led an expedition for the Spanish crown to explore the west coast of what is now the United States. Cabrillo described San Diego Bay as "a very good enclosed port". Historians believe he docked his flagship on Point Loma's east shore, probably at Ballast Point. This was the first landing by a European in present-day California, so that Point Loma has been described as "where California began".

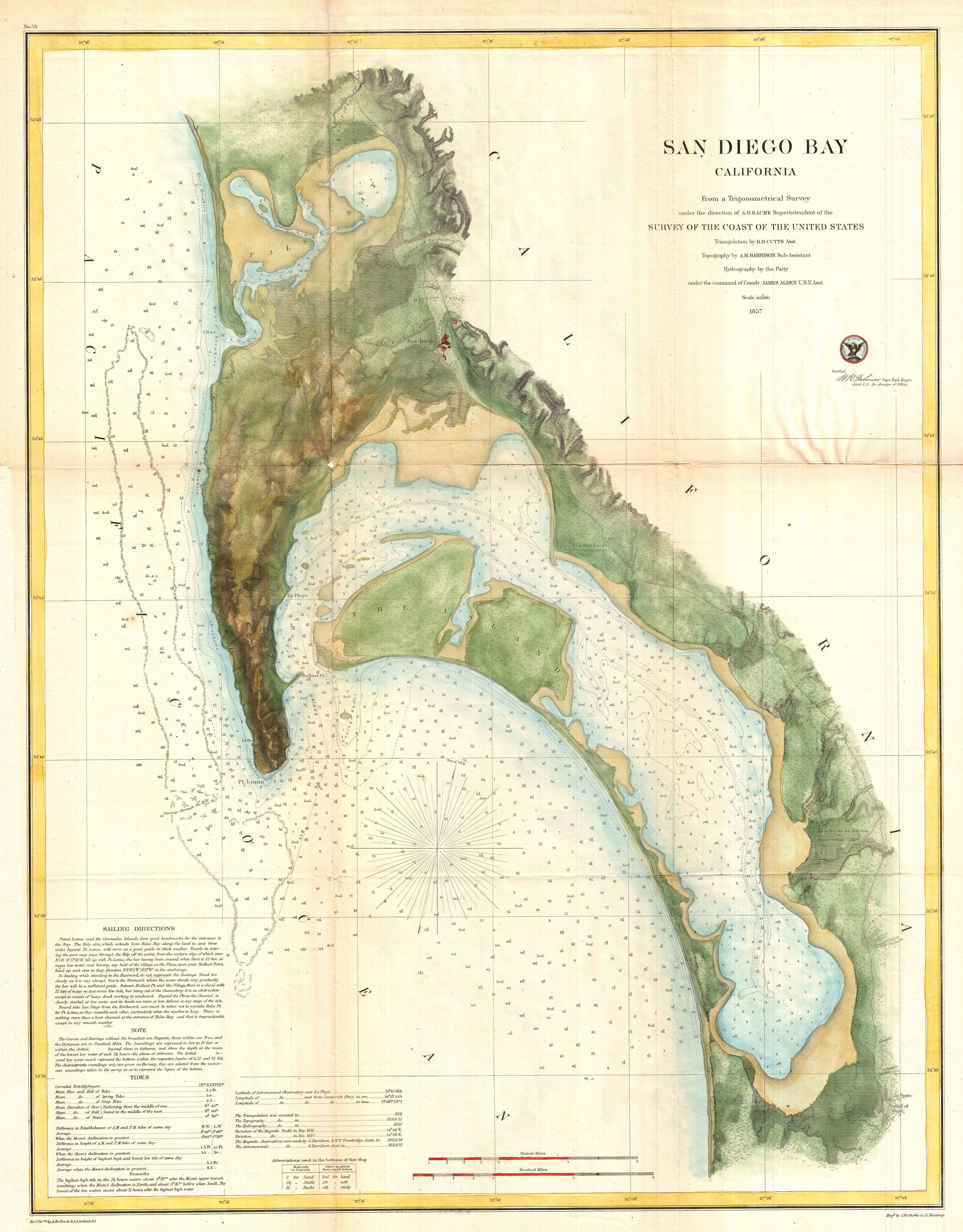
1857 map showing Point Loma in relation to San Diego Bay

More than 200 years were to pass before a permanent European settlement was established in San Diego in 1769. Mission San Diego itself was in the San Diego River valley, but its port was a bayside beach in Point Loma called La Playa (Spanish for beach). The historic La Playa Trail, the oldest European trail on the West Coast, led from the Mission and Presidio to La Playa, where ships anchored and unloaded their cargoes via small boats. Part of the route became present-day Rosecrans Street. In his book Two Years Before the Mast, Richard Henry Dana Jr. describes how sailors in the 1830s camped on the beach at La Playa, accumulated cattle hides for export, and hunted for wood and jackrabbits in the hills of Point Loma. The beach at La Playa continued to serve as San Diego's "port" until the establishment of New Town (current downtown) in the 1870s.

Ballast Point got its name from the practice of ships discarding their ballast there on arriving in San Diego Bay and taking on ballast as they left for the open ocean. Fort Guijarros was constructed at Ballast Point in 1797. Ballast Point and La Playa are now on the grounds of Naval Base Point Loma.

The longtime association of San Diego with the U.S. military began in Point Loma. The southern portion of the Point Loma peninsula was set aside for military purposes as early as 1852. Over the next several decades the U.S. Army set up a series of coastal artillery batteries and named the area Fort Rosecrans. Significant U.S. Navy presence in San Diego began in 1901 with the establishment of the Navy Coaling Station in Point Loma. Marine Corps Recruit Depot San Diego was commissioned in 1921 and Naval Training Center San Diego in 1923, both in Point Loma; the Naval Training Center was closed in 1997. During World War II, the entire southern portion of the peninsula was closed to civilians and used for military purposes, including a battery of coast artillery. Following the war the area retained multiple Navy commands, including a submarine base and a Navy Electronics Laboratory; they were eventually consolidated into Naval Base Point Loma. Other portions of Fort Rosecrans became Fort Rosecrans National Cemetery and Cabrillo National Monument.

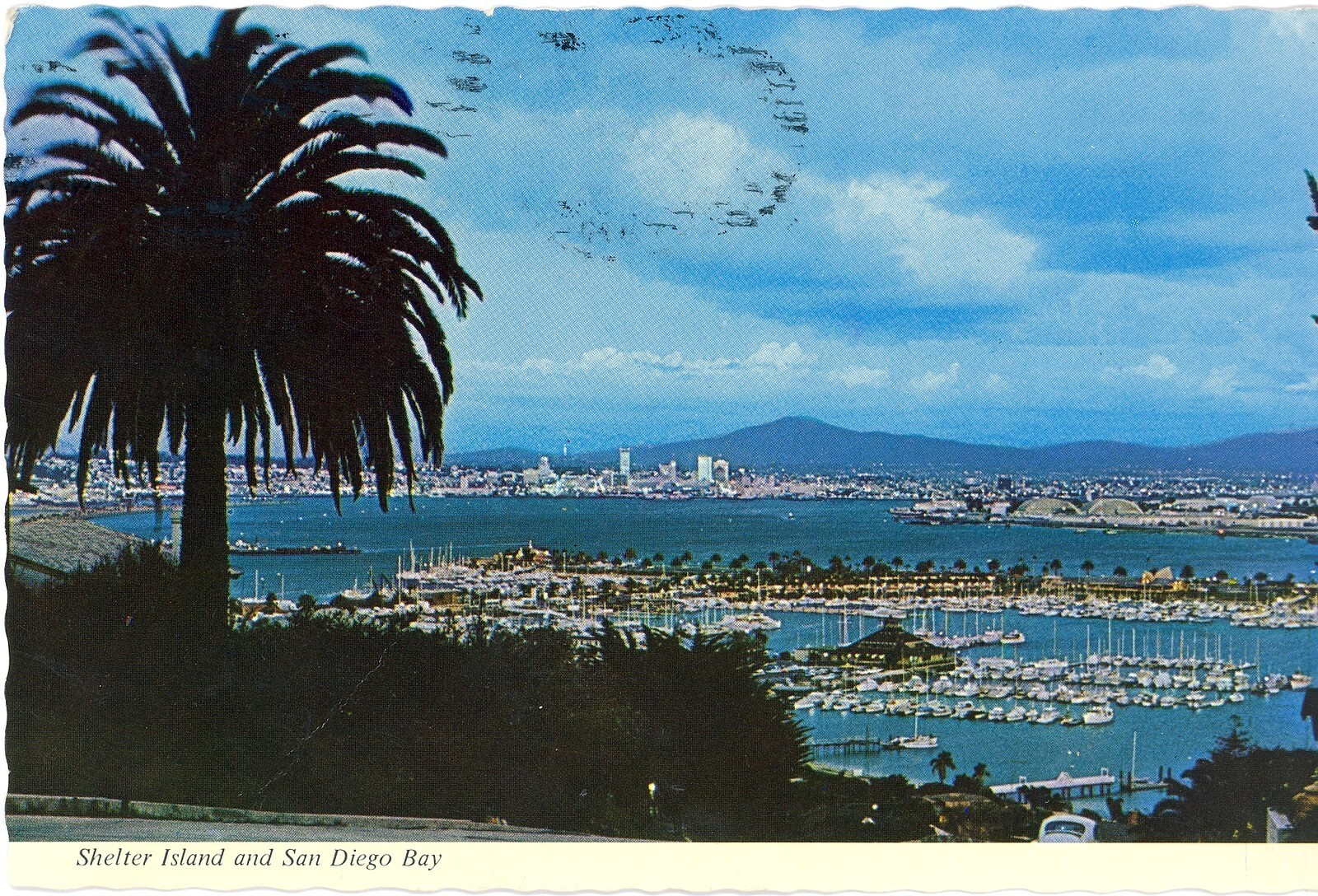
A 1960s era postcard showing the view from Point Loma looking out over San Diego Bay

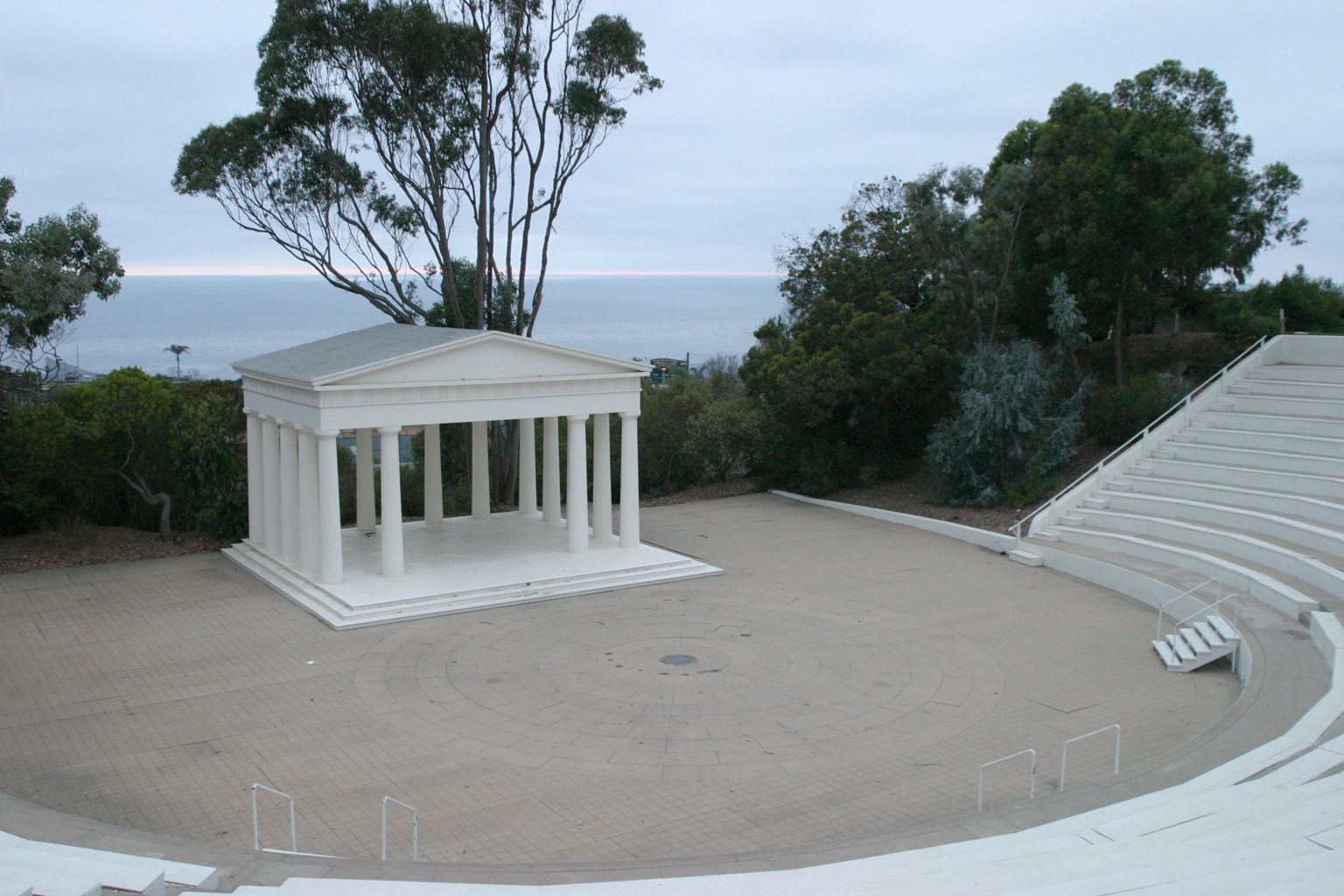
The Greek theatre the Theosophists built in 1901 was the first Greek theater in America.

In the late 1890's, Point Loma became the home of a large community of Theosophists, bringing many nationally known figures to San Diego. Following the death in 1891 of Helena Blavatsky, its founder, Katherine Tingley (the new leader) moved the headquarters of the Theosophical Society from New York City to "Lomaland", a hilltop campus in Point Loma overlooking the ocean. The facility with its unusual architecture and even more unusual lifestyles became an important source of music and culture for residents of San Diego between 1900 and 1920. Producing most of its own food, the Society also experimented widely with planting trees and crops such as eucalyptus and avocado, giving that formerly barren part of Point Loma its current heavily wooded character. The Lomaland site is now the campus of Point Loma Nazarene University.

During the 1920s there was a dirt airstrip known as Dutch Flats in what is now the Midway neighborhood of Point Loma. That is where Charles Lindbergh first tested and flew his airplane, The Spirit of St. Louis, which had been built in San Diego by the Ryan Aeronautical Company. A U.S. Post Office now located on the site contains several historic plaques commemorating Dutch Flats and Lindbergh.

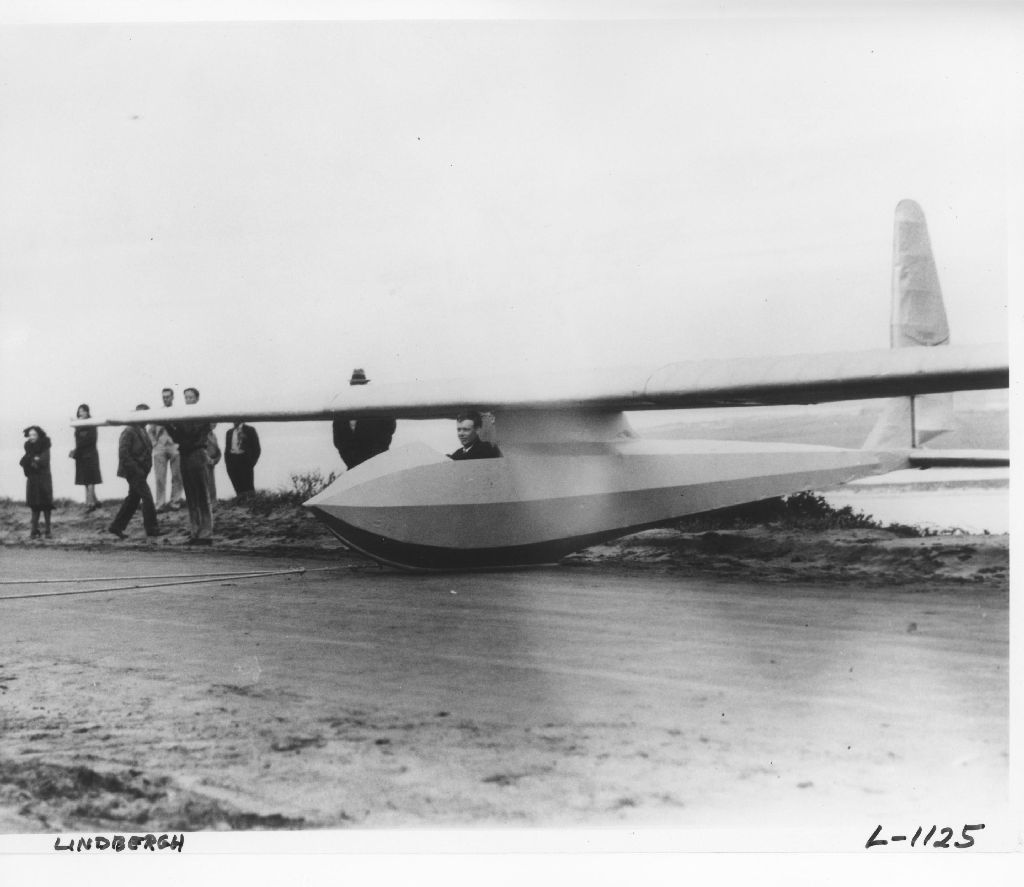
Charles Lindbergh preparing for takeoff in a Bowlus "Model A" sailplane on January 19, 1930, at Point Loma

Due to the prevailing sea-breezes and long north–south ridge, Point Loma was a well-known gliding site during 1929–1935. William Hawley Bowlus, the Superintendent of Construction on the Spirit of St. Louis and a resident of Point Loma, built the first American sailplane, the Bowlus SP-1, and flew that aircraft along the west side of Point Loma to establish new American endurance records. Bowlus later used other refined designs to soar for over 9 hours near Cabrillo National Monument, and one of Bowlus' students, Jack C. Barstow, soared over Point Loma for over 15 hours in 1930 to establish an unofficial world record for soaring endurance. In light of these accomplishments, Point Loma was named as a National Landmark of Soaring by the National Soaring Museum in 1996 with a plaque near the launching area at Cabrillo National Monument.

=== Landmarks ===
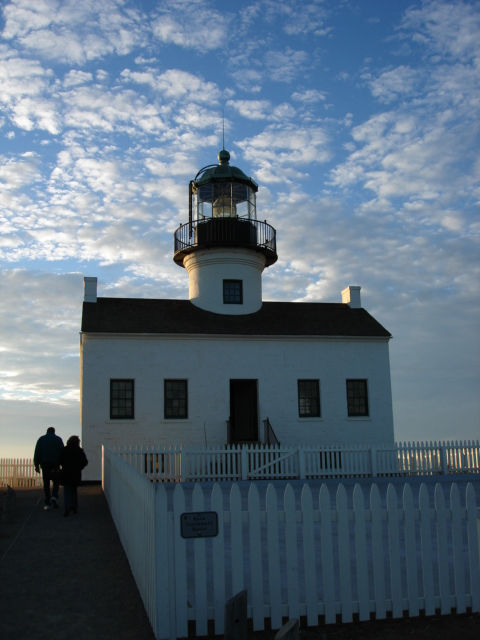
The Old Point Loma Lighthouse

The best known landmark in Point Loma is the Old Point Loma lighthouse, an icon occasionally used to represent the entire city of San Diego. (It is sometimes incorrectly referred to as the "Old Spanish Lighthouse"; in fact it was built after California was admitted to the United States.) Perched atop the southern point that creates the entrance of the bay with Coronado, the small, two-story lighthouse was completed in 1854 and first lit on November 15, 1855. At 422 feet (129 m) above sea level at the entrance of the bay, the seemingly good location for a lighthouse soon proved to be a poor choice, as fog and cloud within the marine layer often obscured the beam for ocean-going vessels. On March 23, 1891, the lighthouse ceased to be used for its original purpose, as a new lighthouse was built nearer sea level on the same southern point. The Old Point Loma Lighthouse is now partially open to the public and has been refurbished to its historic 1880s interior. It is located within Cabrillo National Monument, named after Juan Rodríguez Cabrillo, the first European explorer to see San Diego Bay. The lighthouse is listed on the National Register of Historic Places.

In addition to the lighthouse, there are five other sites in Point Loma listed on the National Register of Historic Places: Cabrillo National Monument, Fort Rosecrans National Cemetery, the Marine Corps Recruit Depot Historic District, Naval Training Center San Diego, and Rosecroft.

Point Loma is recognized as a National Landmark of Soaring of the National Soaring Museum because of the many record flights that took place along the promontory. Two plaques honoring these accomplishments are near the entrance to Cabrillo National Monument.

== Geography ==
=== Geology ===
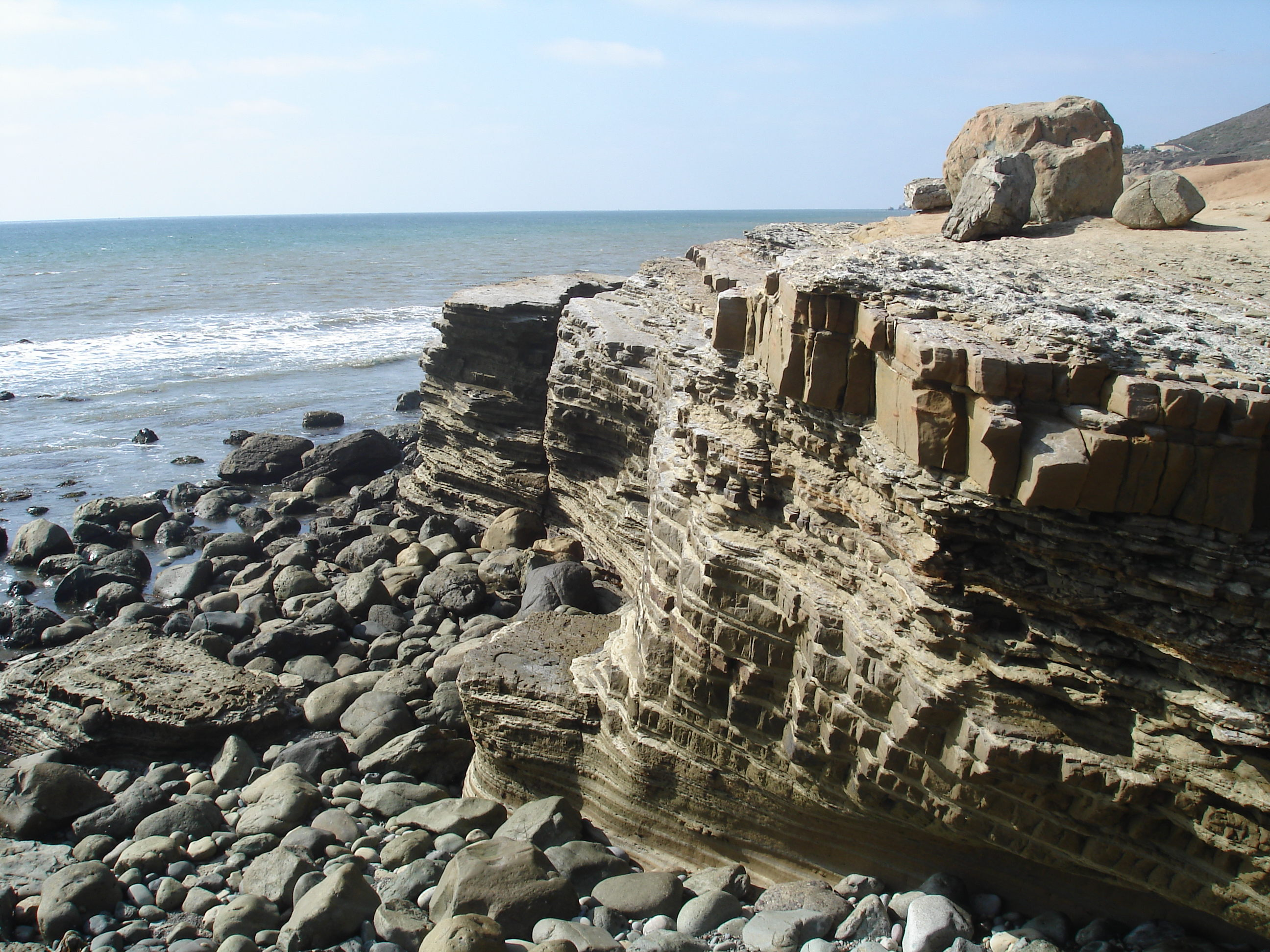
Turbidites, Point Loma Formation. Volcanic boulders of the Santiago Peak Volcanics can be seen in the tidepools below the seacliffs

On the west side of the peninsula there are sandstone cliffs along the ocean, called the Sunset Cliffs. Geologically these cliffs are known as the Point Loma Formation. They contain fossils, including dinosaur fossils, from the Late Cretaceous period, about 75 million years ago. The formation represents one of the few sites containing dinosaur fossils in the state of California. Overlying the Point Loma Formation is another Late Cretaceous deposit called the Cabrillo Formation, which crops out in various areas of Point Loma.

The top of the peninsula is fairly flat, reaches an elevation of 422 ft (129 m), and is capped by much younger sandstone and conglomerate deposits from the Pleistocene era, 1 million years or less in age. These flat-lying beds lie directly on top of the gently dipping Point Loma and Cabrillo formations. The gap in the sedimentary record, called an Angular unconformity, represents about 70 million years of non-deposition and/or erosion.

The cliffs on the ocean side of the peninsula are sheer and are undergoing constant erosion due to wave action. On the east side the land slopes into San Diego Bay more gradually, so that homes and developments go right to the water's edge. At the northern end of the peninsula the cliffs and hills become lower, disappearing entirely in Ocean Beach and the Midway area, where the San Diego River flows.

Much of the Midway area is former marshland which has been filled in for development. In fact, the San Diego River used to flow through the Midway area into San Diego Bay, isolating Point Loma from San Diego. Because of fears that San Diego Bay might silt up, the river was diverted to its present course north of Point Loma by a levee built in 1877. Parts of Liberty Station and Point Loma Village are also fill land, reclaimed from sand spits and wetlands surrounding the Bay. The only remnant of the formerly extensive wetlands in Point Loma, aside from the riverbed itself, is a city-owned nature preserve called Famosa Slough, which branches off from the river near its mouth.

=== Neighborhoods ===
Map of Point Loma and Ocean Beach

There are several distinct neighborhoods in the Point Loma peninsula. Most neighborhoods in Point Loma consist primarily of single family homes. The commercial and retail heart of the peninsula is called Point Loma Village. Its retail establishments serve local residents as well as yachting and sport fishing interests. The streets in Point Loma Village are lined with hundreds of jacaranda trees as a result of community beautification efforts. The newest commercial and retail area is found at Liberty Station, site of the former Naval Training Center San Diego, which also has residential and educational sections. The Midway district at the northern end of the peninsula, adjacent to the San Diego River and the I-5 and I-8 freeways, is primarily commercial and industrial with a few small residential developments.

Connected to Point Loma Village by a causeway is Shelter Island, which is actually not an island but a former sandbank in San Diego Bay. Shelter Island was developed in the 1950s after it was built up into dry land using material dredged from the bay. It is under the control of the Port of San Diego and contains hotels, restaurants, marinas, and public parkland.

The bayside residential area called La Playa lies somewhat north of the original La Playa, the beach where commercial and military ships anchored during the early days of the city. La Playa includes some of the most expensive homes in San Diego. Some bayfront homes have private piers for small boats. The hills above La Playa are known as the Wooded Area on the bay side of Catalina Boulevard (so called because of the many mature trees in the area), and the College Area on the ocean side (because of the proximity of Point Loma Nazarene College). The Sunset Cliffs neighborhood is on the west side, above ocean bluffs, and is known for its views of the Pacific Ocean.

Roseville, named for San Diego pioneer Louis Rose, encompasses the oldest settled part of the peninsula. Roseville was originally a separate town but later was absorbed into San Diego. Many Portuguese fishermen and fishing boat owners settled there more than 100 years ago. Some people refer to the area as "Tunaville" because of its association with the tuna-fishing fleet. The hilly area above Roseville is known as Fleetridge, named for its developer David Fleet, a son of Reuben H. Fleet.

The bayside hills between Rosecrans Street and Chatsworth Boulevard north of Nimitz Boulevard are known as Loma Portal. A distinctive feature of this neighborhood is the location of street lights in the middle of several street intersections instead of on the sidewalk. Loma Portal lies directly in the takeoff pattern for planes from San Diego International Airport, making it the home of the "Point Loma Pause" where all conversation ceases temporarily due to airplane noise. The east–west streets in Roseville and Loma Portal are known as the "alphabetical author streets". The streets are named for authors in alphabetical order from Addison to Zola, with a second partial cycle from Alcott to Lytton.

The northwest corner of the peninsula, where the San Diego River flows into the ocean, is a separate community known as Ocean Beach. The southern one-third of the Point Loma Peninsula is entirely federal land, including Naval Base Point Loma, Fort Rosecrans National Cemetery, and Cabrillo National Monument.

=== Fauna ===
The area contains multiple species of wildlife, both in the federal lands at the southern end of the peninsula (managed in part as an ecological reserve) and in the developed suburban areas. Mammals include raccoons, skunks, possums, bats, rabbits, California ground squirrels, gray foxes, and occasional coyotes. More than 300 species of birds have been observed in Point Loma, which lies on the Pacific Flyway migration route.

== Economy ==
The main economic engines of Point Loma are military facilities, neighborhood-serving retail, and marine recreation, particularly yachting and deep-sea fishing.

=== Tourism ===
Marine activities are mostly located on the Bay (eastern) side of the peninsula, where there are three yacht clubs, including San Diego Yacht Club, which was home to the America's Cup from 1988 to 1995. There are half a dozen small-boat marinas on the Bay side of Point Loma. There is also a commercial dock which services sport fishing cruises as well as seasonal whale watching expeditions. Point Loma hosts the biggest sport fishing fleet in Southern California. The Bay side hosts numerous other businesses related to yachting and fishing, such as marine supply stores, yacht brokerages, boat repair yards, and hotels and motels catering to fishing enthusiasts. Some restaurants and hotels have docks for customers who arrive by boat.

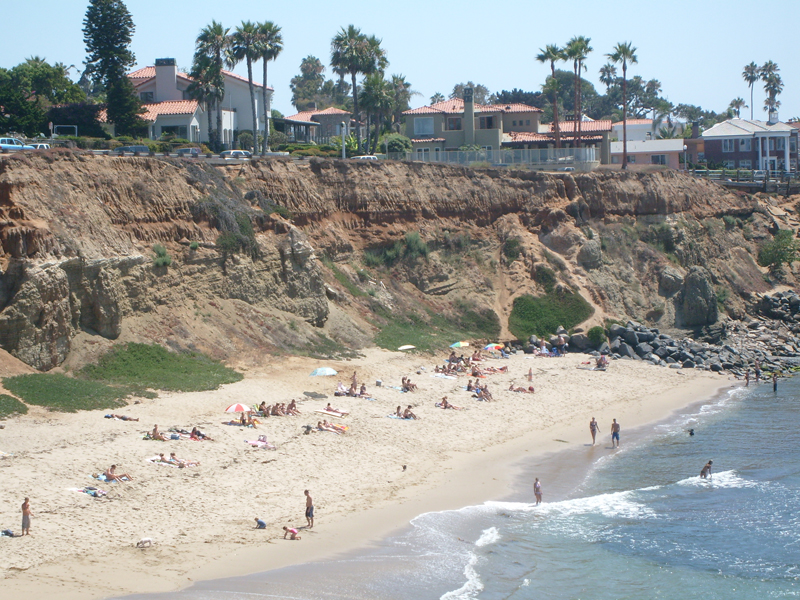
Sunset Cliffs

Tourists and locals visit the cliffs on the western side of the peninsula for views of the ocean and the sunset - hence the name, Sunset Cliffs. The cliffs are unstable and can be dangerous; a woman died in a fall from the cliffs in December 2008, and other falls have resulted in injuries.

The Point Loma area has a number of hotels, restaurants, and local businesses. The San Diego Sports Arena and the SOMA concert venue are located in the Midway neighborhood of Point Loma.

=== Military ===
Point Loma is home to several major military installations including the US Navy's SPAWAR program, the US Marine Corps' Recruit Training Depot (MCRD San Diego) and Naval Base Point Loma. The Navy controls approximately 1,800 acres (730 ha) of Point Loma and provides employment to about 48,000 military personnel and civilians.

Naval Base Point Loma, at the southern end of Rosecrans Street in the La Playa area, is the home of Submarine Squadron 11, with several nuclear fast-attack submarines, and the Naval Mine and Anti-Submarine Warfare Command, including eight Avenger class mine countermeasures ships. The naval base also houses extensive electronic and communications operations (including the former Naval Electronics Laboratory) serving the Pacific Fleet. At the southern end of the peninsula is historic Fort Rosecrans, site of the U.S. Army's Coast Artillery Corps during World War I and World War II. Fort Rosecrans also includes the Fort Rosecrans National Cemetery and the USS Bennington Monument.

Naval Training Center San Diego served as a basic training facility for new Navy recruits for more than 70 years, as well as hosting many specialty schools providing advanced career training for sailors. In April 1997 the base was closed and these schools were moved to Recruit Training Command, Great Lakes, Illinois. The former site of the base is now Liberty Station, a 361-acre (1.46 km^{2}) mixed-use redevelopment project that includes residential, office, retail, educational, and civic, arts and cultural districts. Liberty Station was developed by the City of San Diego and The Corky McMillin companies. It also includes a 9-hole golf course, a 46-acre (190,000 m^{2}) waterfront park and a 100-acre (0.40 km^{2}) historic district listed with the National Register of Historic Places.

== Culture ==
=== Annual events ===
The Day at the Docks festival each April highlights Point Loma's sport fishing industry.

The Festa do Espirito Santo, or Feast of the Holy Spirit, is a religious festival put on by Point Loma's large Portuguese community. It has been staged annually since 1910 and is San Diego's oldest ethnic tradition.

The Cabrillo Festival each October is a weekend-long commemoration of the landing of Juan Rodriguez Cabrillo in Point Loma in 1542.

From June through September, nationally known musicians and comedians perform at an outdoor concert venue on Shelter Island.

A free outdoor concert series features local musicians on five Friday evenings in a local park each summer.

Every year since 1952, the St. Nicholas Home Tour has been held on the first Saturday in December. The tour typically includes 4 - 6 significant homes decorated for the holidays, and is accompanied by tea, cookies, and caroling. All but one of the tours has been hosted by All Souls' Episcopal Church. This is said to be the oldest home tour west of the Mississippi River.

Point Loma is noted for neighborhood Christmas decorations. Several blocks of Garrison Street near Chatsworth are particularly well known for elaborate decorations. There is also a neighborhood-wide lighting of luminarias on Christmas Eve in the Plumosa Park area. On two Sundays in December there is a Parade of Lights, with brightly decorated boats sailing on the Bay to be viewed from the shoreline.

=== Arts and entertainment ===
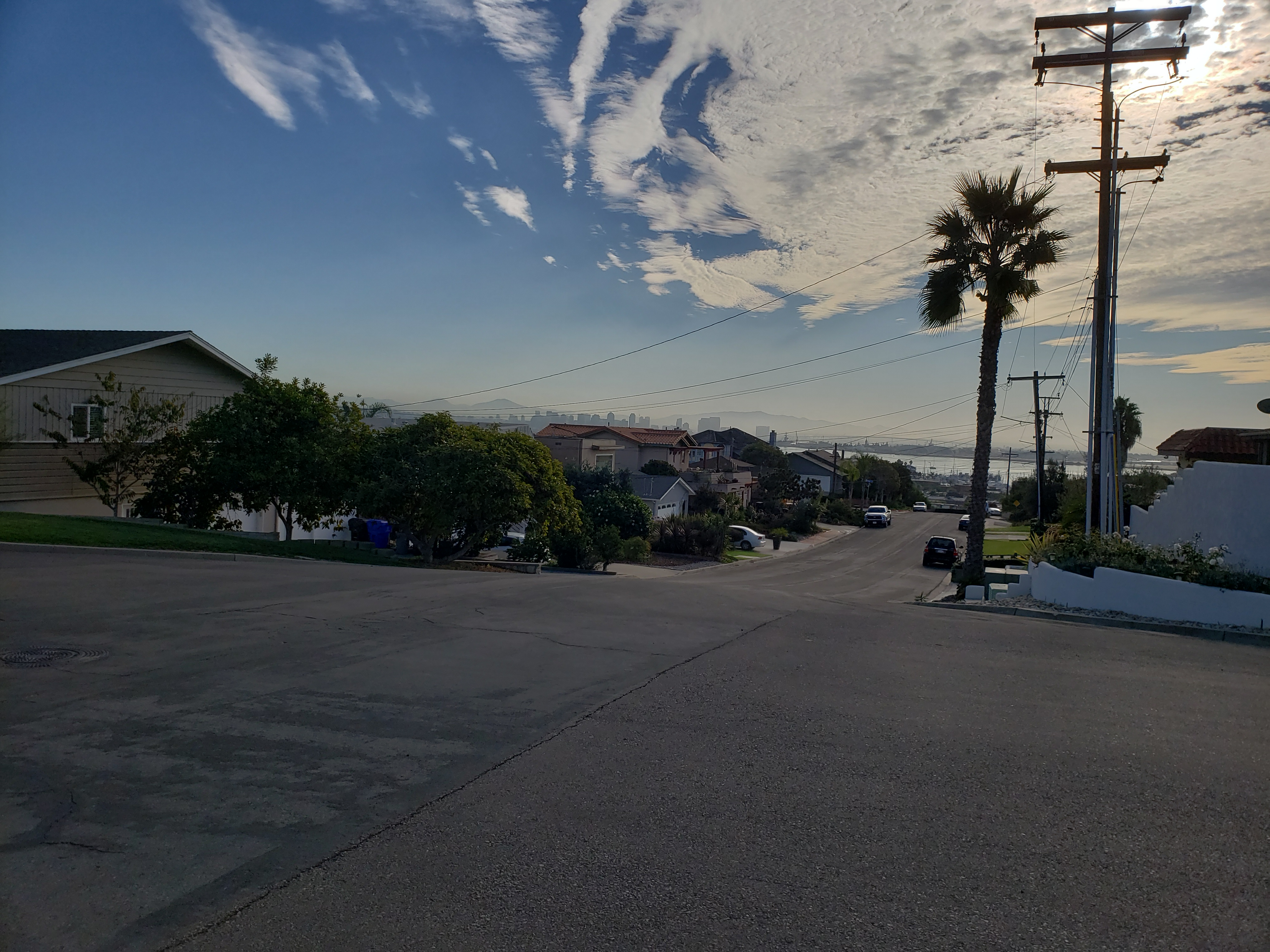
Werner Herzog filmed My Son, My Son, What Have Ye Done (2009) on the streets of Point Loma.

Both Top Gun movies were shot at the New Point Loma Lighthouse and the sequel at Fort Rosecrans National Cemetery. A shipyard set in Patuxent, Maryland, for The Hunt for Red October (1990) was filmed at Naval Base Point Loma. Werner Herzog filmed scenes for My Son, My Son, What Have Ye Done (2009) on the streets of Point Loma. Ken Davitian filmed some of his scenes for The Samuel Project (2018) at Shelter Island Cleaners and Alexandra Slade filmed one of her scenes for Friend of the World (2020) at Sunset Cliffs. Scenes from Antwone Fisher (2002) and Skid Marks (2007) were also filmed in Point Loma.

=== Civic organizations ===
Civic organizations include the Point Loma Association, a nonprofit group dedicated to beautification and civic improvement, and the Peninsula Chamber of Commerce. Service clubs include Rotary, Kiwanis, Optimists, Lions, the Point Loma Assembly, and the Thursday Club.

=== Parks and libraries ===
Point Loma contains a few small neighborhood parks and the Cabrillo Recreation Center. There is large waterfront park at Liberty Station, which also contains a nine-hole golf course. Most of the ocean frontage of the peninsula is a public shoreline park called Sunset Cliffs Natural Park. The Point Loma Native Plant Garden features plants and flowers native to the San Diego area. Cabrillo National Monument is a federal historic park at the southern end of the peninsula.

The James Edgar and Jean Jessop Hervey Public Library opened in 2003, replacing a much smaller public library. The new library, built by Conwell Shonkwiler & Associates, was partly funded by a donation via the San Diego Foundation from the Hervey family, who had close ties to the area. Jean Jessop Hervey in particular used to visit the old Point Loma Library every Tuesday to read with her children. The library, located at 3701 Voltaire Street, is over 25,000 square feet and holds over 80,000 books. It includes a kitchen area, a community meeting room, and outdoor sitting patios. The lower floor is the largest children's library in the City of San Diego, featuring a simulated ship, reading desks shaped like surfboards, an art space and a Story Time Zone. In connecting to the place of Point Loma, the library's architectural style features a nautical theme. There is even an operating periscope, salvaged from a U.S. Navy submarine, through which visitors can see the surrounding neighborhood. The floor in the entry lobby features a terrazzo map of the Point Loma Peninsula. The library holds scheduled events such as story time for children, Thursday after school movies, and arts and crafts demonstrations.

== Government ==
The Point Loma community is part of the city of San Diego. On the San Diego City Council it is part of District 2, currently represented by Jennifer Campbell. In the government of San Diego County, Point Loma is divided between District 1 and District 4. In the California state legislature it is part of Assembly District 78, currently represented by assembly member Todd Gloria and Senate District 39, represented by Senator Toni Atkins. At the federal level it is part of the 52nd Congressional District and is represented by Congressman Scott Peters.

Some portions of the Point Loma peninsula are not under the jurisdiction of the city, including the federal and military lands as well as the bayside tidelands governed by the Port of San Diego. Approximately 60% of the Point Loma community is included in the Coastal Zone and is subject to regulation by the California Coastal Commission.

The Peninsula Community Planning Board is an advisory board which makes recommendations to the city on planning, land use, and similar matters for the Point Loma area. There are separate planning boards for Ocean Beach and the Midway area.

== Education ==
Point Loma has several public, charter, and private schools at the elementary, middle, and high school levels, as well as multiple private preschools, an adult school and a university. Point Loma's public schools are part of San Diego Unified School District. Neighborhood public schools include Point Loma High School, two middle schools, and seven elementary schools. There is also a public charter school campus in the Liberty Station area which encompasses three high schools, two middle schools, and two elementary schools, collectively known as High Tech High. Point Loma educational facilities also include a K-12 religious school, a religious elementary/middle school, and a private elementary/middle school.

Post-secondary education is offered at Point Loma Nazarene University, a Christian liberal arts college whose ocean-view campus was once the home of the Theosophical Society. The Peninsula also has a branch campus of the San Diego Community College District.

== Infrastructure ==
Interstate 8 freeway follows the northern edge of the Point Loma peninsula, paralleling the San Diego River, and terminates a few blocks from the Pacific Ocean. Rosecrans Street is the north–south avenue that serves the bay side of Point Loma, while Sunset Cliffs Boulevard is the north–south avenue on the ocean side; the two streets run parallel to each other and to Catalina Boulevard on the crest of the hill. The former California State Route 209 followed Rosecrans and Catalina to the southern end of the Point. Sports Arena Boulevard, West Point Loma Boulevard, Harbor Drive and Nimitz Boulevard are other major traffic pipelines in Point Loma.

Most streets in the coastal sections, both bay and ocean, are laid out in a rough grid pattern, with the oceanside blocks larger than the bayside. The grid breaks down in the hilly center, particularly west of Chatsworth Boulevard and east of Catalina and Nimitz Boulevard, where streets have more terrain-following, curvy patterns. Some streets are broken into multiple disconnected sections by intervening canyons or hills. The presence of hills and canyons, together with the restraints imposed by a long narrow peninsula, result in "circuitous routing of traffic and a great deal of out-of-direction travel."

== Notable people ==
- Charlotte Johnson Baker, 1855–1937, first woman physician in San Diego, first female president of the San Diego County Medical Society
- Fred Baker (physician), 1854–1938, physician, civic activist, member and president of the City Council, founder of Scripps Institution of Oceanography
- Belle Benchley, 1882–1973, director of the San Diego Zoo for 25 years; for most of that time she was the only female zoo director in the world
- Dennis Conner, 1942–, yacht racer
- Richard Henry Dana Jr., 1815–1882, author who wrote about early 19th century San Diego
- Kevin Faulconer, 1967–, mayor of San Diego
- Reuben H. Fleet, 1887–1975, founder of Convair
- Randy Gardner, 1947–, Record holder for longest scientifically documented time without sleep
- Jack O. Gross, 1905–1985, KFMB-TV founder
- Justin Halpern, 1980–, author of the best selling book Sh*t My Dad Says
- Ed Harris, 1946–, member of the San Diego City Council
- Frankie Laine, 1913–2007, singer
- Bob Mendoza, professional baseball player and coach, San Diego Hall of Champions inductee
- Maureen O'Connor, 1946–, first female mayor of San Diego
- Robert O. Peterson, 1916–1994, founder of Jack in the Box fast food chain
- Conrad Prebys, 1933–2016, developer and philanthropist
- Alfred D. Robinson, 1866-1942 and Marion James Robinson, 1873–1919, builders of Rosecroft
- Louis Rose, 1807–1888, early developer, founder of Roseville
- T. Claude Ryan, 1898–1982, aviation pioneer, founder of Ryan Aeronautical
- Albert Spalding, 1850–1915, founder of the A. G. Spalding sports equipment company
- Katherine Tingley, 1847–1929, Theosophist, founder of Lomaland
- Judith M. Tyberg, 1902–1980, yogi, Sanskrit scholar, orientalist, theosophist, founder of East-West Cultural Center, Los Angeles.
- Joseph Wambaugh, 1937–, author

== See also ==
- List of communities and neighborhoods of San Diego

== Bibliography ==
- Engstrand, Iris (2005). San Diego: California's Cornerstone. Sunbelt. ISBN 0-932653-72-3.
- Baker, Gayle (2007). San Diego: Another HarborTown History. Pacific Books. ISBN 978-0-9710984-6-6.
