= Tourmaline Surfing Park =

Beach access point and surf spot in San Diego, California

Coordinates: 32°48′17″N 117°15′44″W

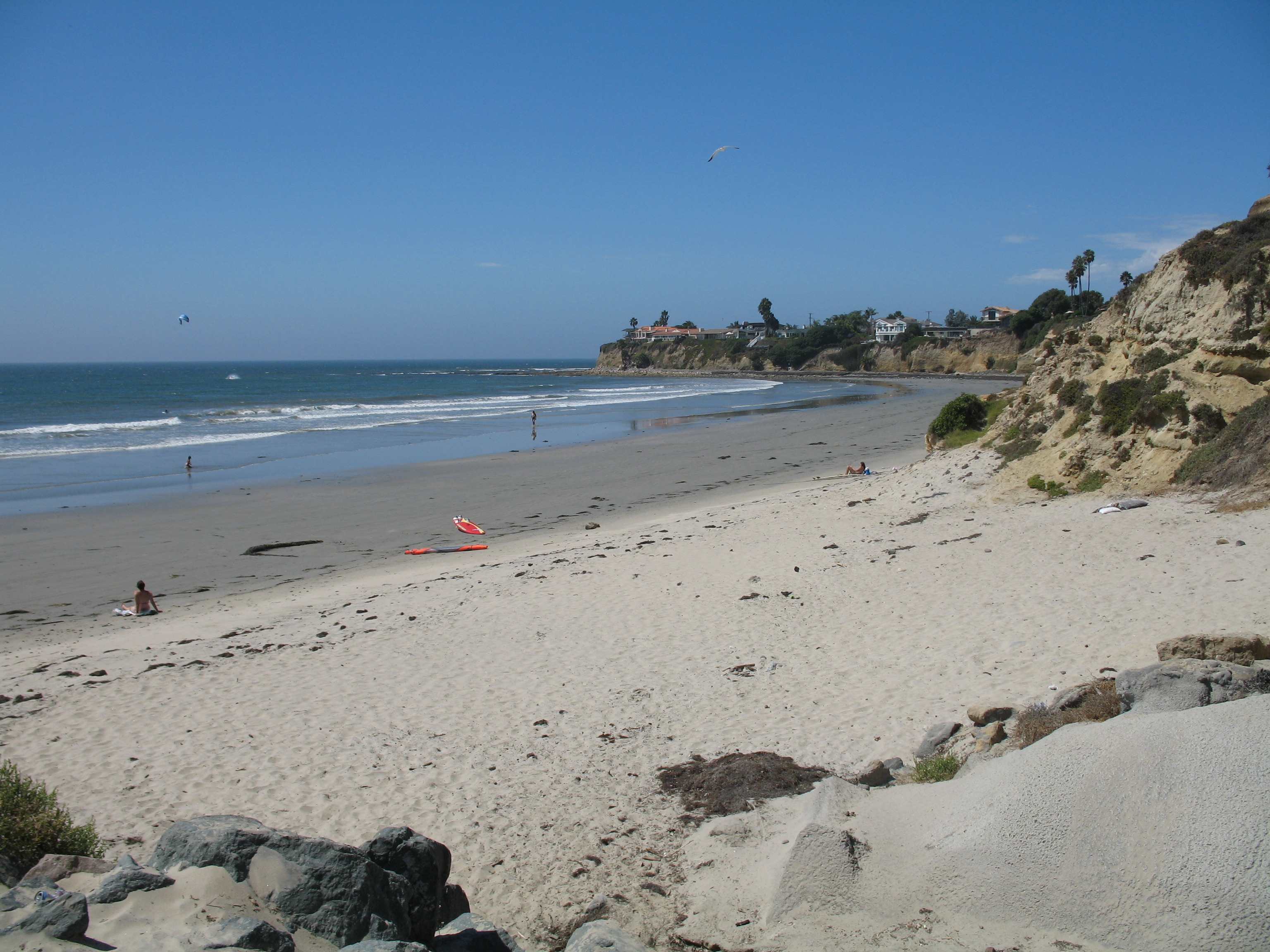
A view of the beach at Tourmaline Surfing Park looking north, with False Point in La Jolla visible in the distance. September 2006

Tourmaline Surfing Park is a beach access point and surfing spot in North Pacific Beach, a neighborhood of San Diego, California. The park is situated at the northern end of Pacific Beach, a short distance south of where the sand beach ends and the rocky promontory of La Jolla begins. There are cliffs to the north and south of Tourmaline Surfing Park, but the park itself lies in Tourmaline Canyon, which cuts down through the cliffs to the beach. Tourmaline Surfing Park is also known locally as Old Man's and is a known for its more gentle waves. It attracts surfers of all kinds but is known as a great spot for longboarders and beginners.

Tourmaline Surfing Park is less than 1000 feet west of the point where Tourmaline Street crosses La Jolla Boulevard. Reaching the park involves a steep, palm-lined descent through Tourmaline Canyon to a fairly large parking lot, which is slightly elevated but situated right beside the beach. There are showers and restrooms, as well as railings and places to sit.

== History ==
In the 1960s, the beach was a popular surfing spot, but ocean side property owners complained about the "rowdy" presence of the surfers. A town council tried to reconcile the parties by setting up a set of rules regarding surfing on the beach. The decision to create a delimited surf park finally made its way and was completed in 1965 (inaugural date May 25th, 1965). Surf clubs also emerged in the area with members encouraging other surfers to respect the beaches and their surroundings.

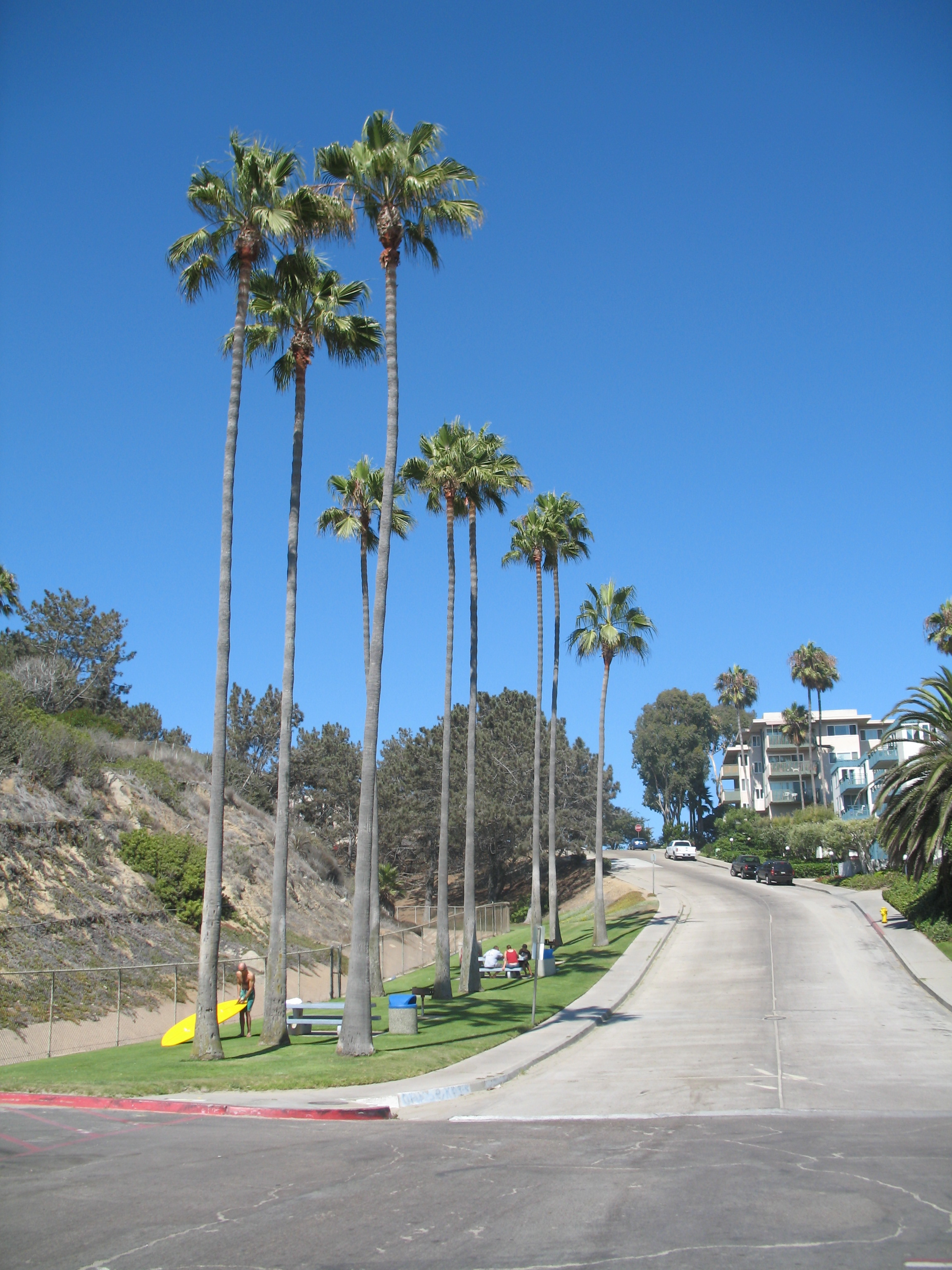
The view looking inland from the parking lot at Tourmaline Surf Park. August, 2007

== Tourmaline Memorial ==
Tourmaline Surfing Park also features "Tourmaline Memorial" a monument celebrating surfers who have enjoyed the surf at Tourmaline, in the past and the present, including Skeeter Malcolm.

Although surfers have surfed the area since the 1930s, Tourmaline Surfing Park first opened in May 1963; the idea for the memorial was conceived in 2006, and the memorial itself was completed in 2008. The motto is "Surf Well, Spread Aloha, Share Waves Without Judgment".

Tourmaline was the country's first surf park.

=== List of honorees ===
The list of honorees on the memorial is as follows:

Individual surfers

- Larry Gordon
- Floyd Smith
- Bobby "Challenger" Thomas
- Mike Hynson
- Skip Frye
- William " Hadji" Hein
- Emil Sigler
- Doc Paskowitz
- Woody Brown
- Don Okey
- Skeeter Malcolm
- Norm Polonski
- Ralph Dawson
- Doc Blankenship
- Bo Smith
- "Captain" Dan O'Connell
- Alexander "Bud" Caldwell
- Billie "Goldie" Goldsmith
- Ralph Barber
- Joe Gann
- Robert "Black mac" Mc Clendon
- Holly "Papa Smurf" Jones
- Ron St. John

Surfing clubs

- Kanakas Surf Club
- Windansea Surf Club
- Pacific Beach Surf Club
- Tourmaline Tailgater's Surfing Association

== Filmography ==
- A Line In The Sand: The Story Of America's First Surfing Park, 2023, KPBS

== See also ==
- List of beaches in San Diego County
- List of California state parks

To the North: Windansea Beach	California beaches	To the South; Pacific Beach, San Diego

To the North: Windansea Beach	California beaches	To the South; Pacific Beach
