= Alfred D. Robinson and Marion James Robinson =

American horticulturists

Alfred D. Robinson
- Born: October 9, 1866; Watton, Norfolk, England
- Died: February 26, 1942 (aged 75); San Diego, California, United States
- Occupation: retired merchant
- Known for: horticulturalist, developed many varieties of begonia

Marion James Robinson
- Born: Marion James Duncan; October 1873; San Francisco, California, US
- Died: June 13, 1919 (aged 45); San Diego, California, US
- Known for: promoting gardening in San Diego

Alfred D. Robinson (1866–1942) and his wife Marion James Robinson (1873–1919) were wealthy residents of San Diego, California, known for their impact on gardening and the cultivation of flowers, particularly begonias. Their extensive home garden was used to propagate and develop more than 100 new varieties of ornamental flowers and was later opened to the public as Rosecroft Begonia Gardens. Rosecroft was the name of their estate in the Point Loma neighborhood of San Diego. The residence, built for them in 1912, is now listed on the National Register of Historic Places.

== Early life ==
Marion J. Duncan was born in San Francisco in October 1873. Marion was the only grandchild and her father Hilarion was the only child of the wealthy Scottish merchant James Duncan (1796 or 1798 - 1874). James Duncan had made his fortune in copper during three decades as a merchant in Valparaíso, Chile, before retiring to Britain in 1864. He was born and is buried on the Scottish Highland Isle of Bute, where he is known as "The Copperman". The name of her estate, Rosecroft, was Marion's nod to her Highland Scottish heritage.

Alfred D. Robinson was born in Watton, Norfolk, England, and emigrated to the US in 1887 at the age of 21. After a brief stint as a cattle rancher he became a medical instruments merchant with the firm Hoppe and Robinson in Santa Ana in Orange County, California. In 1897 he married Marion J. Duncan; the couple had two children, Larona (born 1901) and Charlotte (born 1908).

For the first six years of their marriage the Robinsons lived in her widowed father Hilarion's large home at 1823 Turk St in San Francisco. With the death of her father on November 17, 1901, Marion inherited the bulk of her grandfather's fortune, giving the couple independent means.

== San Diego ==
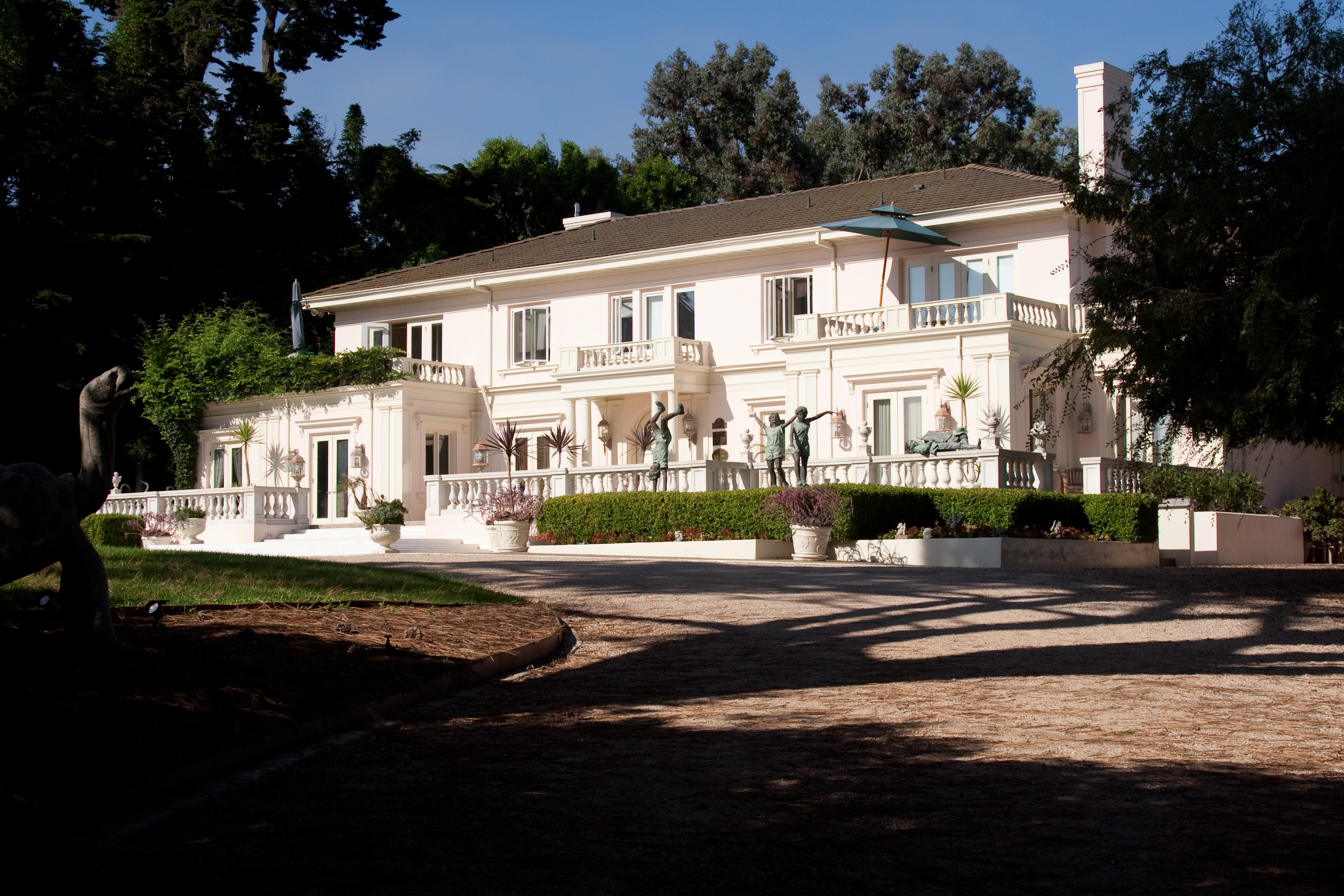
Rosecroft in 2012

In San Francisco the Robinsons heard a lecture by Theosophist Katherine Tingley, describing the utopian community "Lomaland" which she was developing in the Point Loma area of San Diego. In 1903, they purchased 10 acres of barley fields in Point Loma near Lomaland and enrolled their daughter Larona in the Lomaland school. However, Larona was frail and did not thrive at Lomaland; she died of a heart ailment in 1909. The couple broke off all ties with Tingley and the Theosophists. After making a trip to Britain in 1904, the Robinsons settled permanently in San Diego in 1905. They developed the fields into half a city block of gardens, where they cultivated various ornamental plants, particularly begonias. In 1912, they moved into their new 15,000-square-foot, Italian Renaissance style mansion, Rosecroft, designed by architect Emmor Brooke Weaver.

Alfred, a self-taught horticulturist, began experimenting with roses and dahlias, but eventually came to focus on begonias. He became "the pre-eminent begonia expert", developing more than 100 new varieties at the Rosecroft estate. Alfred's were judged "the finest begonias to be grown anywhere in the world" by plant explorer and botanist David Fairchild.

Alfred originated the idea of using lath houses to grow tropical plants in temperate climates. In 1912 he proposed, in an article in Sunset magazine, that the Panama–California Exposition then being planned for San Diego should include a "Palace of Lath"; this inspired the Botanical Building in Balboa Park.

Both Robinsons were enthusiastic promoters of home gardening in San Diego. In 1907 they were co-founders, along with Kate Sessions, of the San Diego Floral Association. Alfred was the Floral Association's first president and also served as the editor of its magazine, California Garden.

Marion died in 1919. In 1922, Alfred married Annie Louisa Colby Robinson (1891-1981), the governess to his daughter Charlotte; they had five children. After Alfred's death in 1942, Annie sold the property. A new owner opened the garden and lath house to the public as Rosecroft Begonia Gardens. The gardens were a popular tourist attraction through the 1960s. In the 1970s, the property was sold and the garden area subdivided for residential use. The original main residence is privately owned and is listed on the National Register of Historic Places.

== Recognition ==
- The American Begonia Society gives an annual Alfred D. Robinson Medal of Honor for creating new varieties of begonia.
- In 2005 the San Diego Floral Association dedicated a bronze plaque to Alfred D. Robinson; the plaque hangs in the Botanical Building in Balboa Park.
