= Botanical Building =

Botanical garden and historic building in San Diego, California, U.S.

- The building's exterior in 2026

General information
- Location: San Diego, California, United States
- Coordinates: 32.7325°N 117.1492°W

The Botanical Building is a historic building in Balboa Park in San Diego, California, United States. Built for the 1915–16 Panama–California Exposition, it remains one of the largest lath structures in the world. Alfred D. Robinson (1867–1942), founder and president of the San Diego Floral Society, suggested the construction of a lath house as a feature of the Panama–California Exposition, which was to open in the City of San Diego on January 1, 1915.

The building was closed in 2021 for renovations and reopened three years later in December 2024.

== Botanical Garden Lily Pond ==
A garden and Lily Pond was built in front of the building in 1915 for the Panama–California Exposition. During World War I and II, the Navy used the pond for swimming lessons.
