= Kate Sessions =

American botanist and landscape architect (1857–1940)

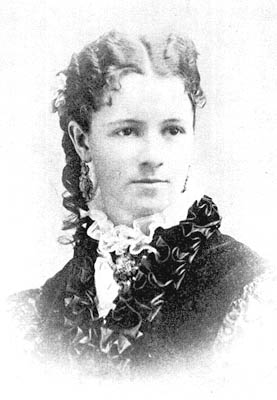
- Born: Katherine Olivia Sessions; November 8, 1857; San Francisco, California, U.S.
- Died: March 24, 1940 (aged 82); San Diego, California, U.S.
- Resting place: Mount Hope Cemetery, San Diego
- Occupations: Horticulturalist, landscape architect
- Known for: "Mother of Balboa Park"; introduced trees and plants to San Diego

Sessions Nursery Site Marker
- Interactive map of Sessions Nursery Site Marker
- Location: Corner of Garnet Ave and Pico Street, San Diego, California
- Coordinates: 32.805°N 117.223°W

California Historical Landmark
- Designated: April 28, 1961
- Reference no.: 764

Katherine Olivia Sessions (November 8, 1857 – March 24, 1940) was an American botanist, horticulturalist, and landscape architect closely associated with San Diego, California. She is known as the "Mother of Balboa Park".

== Early life and education ==
Sessions was born in San Francisco, California, and educated in Oakland. At the age of six, she moved with her family to a farm next to Lake Merritt.

She enrolled at the University of California, Berkeley, in 1877 and graduated with a degree in natural science in 1881. Her graduating thesis paper was titled “The Natural Sciences as a Field for Women’s Labor."

While attending a San Francisco business school, at the request of a friend, she moved to San Diego in 1883 to work as an eighth-grade teacher and vice principal at Russ School. She worked at the school for over a year before leaving due to health problems.

== Career ==
In San Diego, Sessions pursued her interest in the cultivation of plants. In 1885, she purchased a nursery; within a few years she was the owner of a flower shop as well as growing fields and nurseries in Coronado, Pacific Beach, and Mission Hills. The Mission Hills Nursery, which she founded in 1910 and sold to her employees the Antonicelli brothers in 1926, is still in operation.

In 1892, Sessions leased 30 acres (120,000 m^{2}) of land in Balboa Park (then called City Park) from the City of San Diego to use as growing fields. In return, she agreed to plant 100 trees a year in the mostly barren park, as well as 300 trees a year in other parts of San Diego. This arrangement left the park with an array of cypress, pine, oak, pepper trees and eucalyptus grown in her gardens from seeds imported from around the world; virtually all of the older trees still seen in the park were planted by her.

Among her many plant introductions, Sessions is credited with importing and popularizing the jacaranda in the city. She also collected, propagated, and introduced many California native plants to the horticulture trade and into gardens. In 1900, Sessions travelled to Baja California to find a palm tree not native to San Diego to be planted at the park. Sessions is noted for planting a towering Guadalupe cypress tree, which can still be seen near Balboa Park's Horseshoe Club. This tree is rare today due to damage in its native habitat by imported goats.

She would also later take a seven-month trip through Europe where she collected multiple plant varieties that she eventually helped plant in the park.

Together with Alfred D. Robinson, she co-founded the San Diego Floral Association in 1907; it is the oldest garden club in Southern California. The garden club was influential in teaching San Diegans how to grow ornamental and edible plants, at a time when most San Diego landscaping consisted of dirt and sagebrush. Sessions also wrote articles on gardening for local newspapers and helped organize San Diego first Arbor Day celebration in 1904. Sessions collaborated with architect Hazel Wood Waterman on the garden design of three courtyard homes built by San Diego civic leader Alice Lee on Seventh Ave. near Balboa Park.

== Personal life ==
Sessions never married, but maintained a close and lifelong friendship with Alice Eastwood and some people speculate that she may have been a member of the LGBTQ+ community.

Sessions's family followed her from the Bay Area to San Diego. She took on relatives as partners in business. Her father, Josiah, was a helper to her until his death in 1903 after her mother, Harriett, died in 1895. Frank, her only sibling, helped to start the first poinsettia nursery in Mission Hills.

Despite 60 years of 12- and 14-hour work days, she gave herself only two vacations, and both included some horticultural work.

Sessions died in San Diego on March 24, 1940, after contracting pneumonia, at the age of 82. At her funeral, her pallbearers included Senator Ed Fletcher. She is interred next to her brother and parents in Mount Hope Cemetery in San Diego. One of her favorite trees, a twisted juniper, grows alongside her gravesite.

Upon Sessions's death, the city of San Diego passed a resolution in her honor, stating: "San Diego has recently suffered the loss of a most worthy citizen in the passing of Kate Sessions who contributed most in establishing the horticultural beauty of our city. One who gave graciously of her time and professional knowledge so that, today, San Diego is known as the 'beauty spot' of California..."

Sessions had no heirs except Milton, the son of her brother Frank.

== Legacy ==
"Botanically speaking, I would call Miss Sessions a perennial, evergreen and everblooming."

—George Marston, at a 1935 garden dedication in her honor

Sessions' work with plant introduction, as well as her extensive writing on the subject, won her international recognition. At the California Pacific International Exposition on September 22, 1935, the day was dedicated to Sessions, where she was named the "Mother of Balboa Park". In 1939, she became the first woman to receive the prestigious Frank N. Meyer medal of the American Genetic Association.

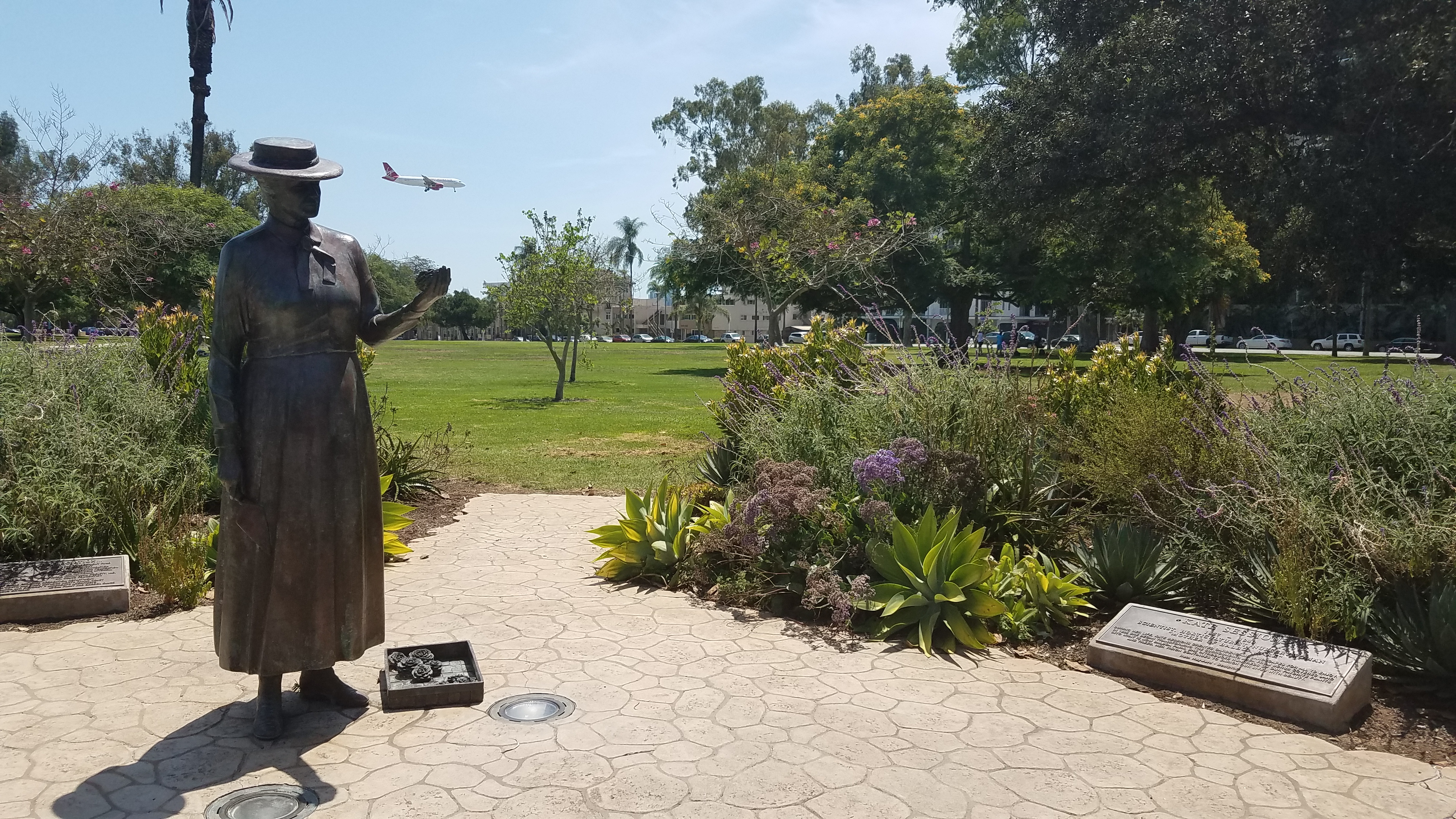
Bronze statue of Kate Sessions in Balboa Park

In the San Diego area, the Kate Sessions Elementary school in Pacific Beach bears her name, as does Kate Sessions Memorial Park on Mount Soledad, located less than a mile from the school and constructed only a few years later.

A bronze statue of Sessions, dedicated in 1998, is situated in a prominent location in Balboa Park, in the southwest corner of Sefton Plaza, near the Sixth Avenue entrance to the park.

In 2006, the Women's Museum of California inducted Sessions into the San Diego County Women's Hall of Fame, under the title of Trailblazer.

== In popular culture ==
A 2013 children's picture book, The Tree Lady: The True Story of How One Tree-Loving Woman Changed a City Forever, tells the story of Sessions's life, education, and contribution to San Diego civic life.

== Selected works ==
- The complete writings of Kate Sessions in California garden, 1909-1939. San Diego, Calif.: San Diego Floral Association. 1998. OCLC 40978506.

== Bibliography ==
- Christman, Florence (1985). The Romance of Balboa Park (4th ed.). San Diego: San Diego Historical Society. ISBN 0-918740-03-7.
- Pourade, Richard F. (1965). Gold in the Sun (1st ed.). San Diego: The Union-Tribune Publishing Company. ISBN 0-913938-04-1.
- MacPhail, Elizabeth C. (1976). Kate Sessions : pioneer horticulturist. San Diego Historical Society.
- Showley, Robert M. (2000). San Diego: Perfecting Paradise. Heritage Media Corp. ISBN 1-886483-24-8.
