= Pacific Beach, San Diego =

- Community of San Diego
- Pacific Beach
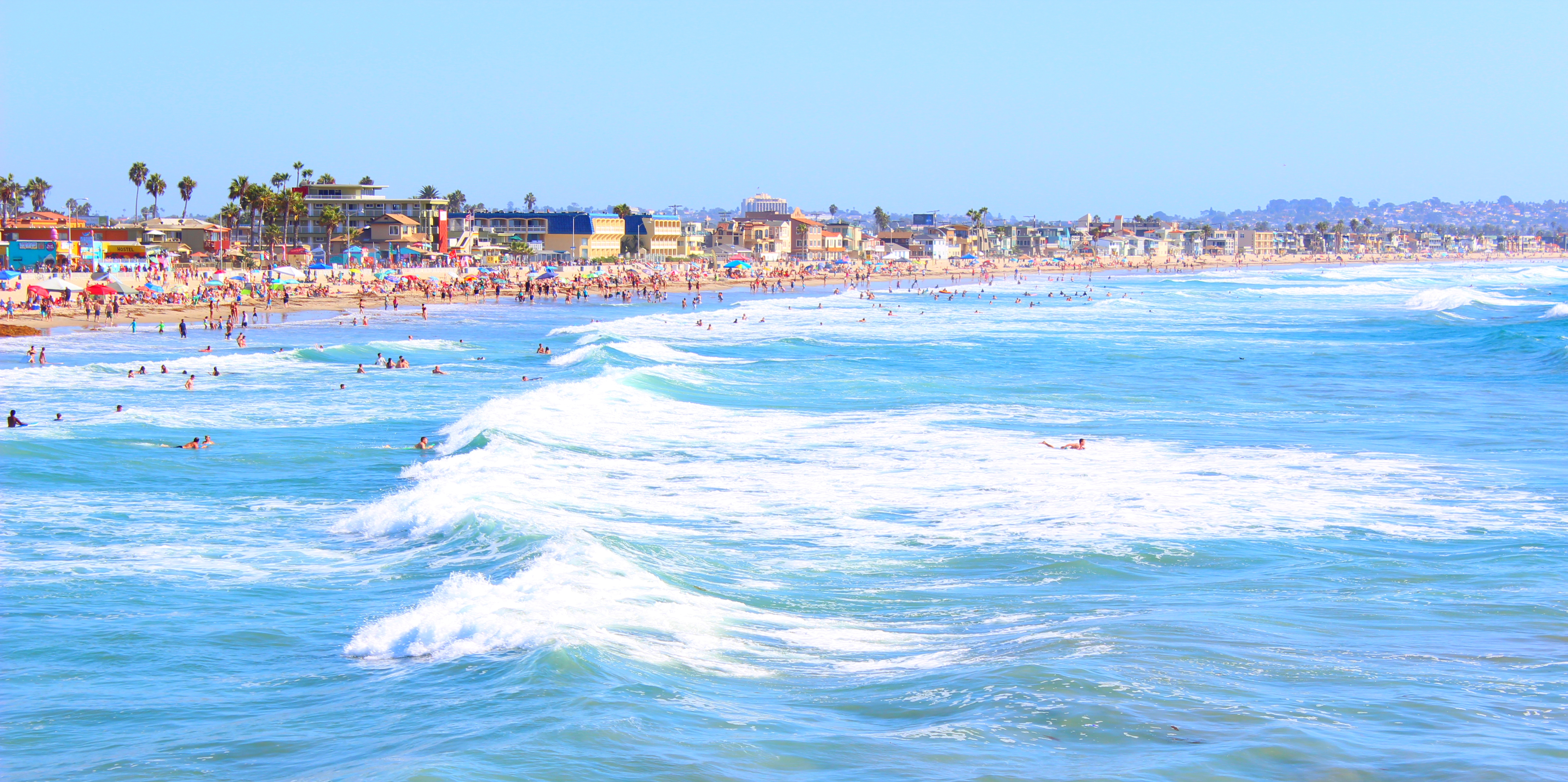
- The beach at Pacific Beach looking south
- Nickname: "P.B."
- Location within Central San Diego Pacific Beach, San Diego (California) Pacific Beach, San Diego (the United States)
- Coordinates: 32.7978265°N 117.2403142°W
- Country: United States of America
- State: California
- County: San Diego
- City: San Diego

Pacific Beach is a neighborhood in San Diego, California, bounded by La Jolla to the north, Mission Beach and Mission Bay to the south, Interstate 5 and Clairemont to the east and the Pacific Ocean to the west. While formerly largely populated by young people, surfers, and college students, because of rising property and rental costs the population is gradually becoming older and more affluent. "P.B.," as it is known as by local residents, is home to one of San Diego's more developed nightlife scenes, with a great variety of bars, eateries, and clothing stores located along Garnet Avenue and Mission Boulevard.

== History ==
Before European contact, the area was settled by the Kumeyaay people, who built a large village then known as Hamo, or Jamo, on the banks of Rose Creek at the entrance of Rose Canyon.

As with many California cities, the history of San Diego's development can be traced back to the completion of a cross-country railroad in 1885. The town developed during the boom years between 1886 and 1888 by D. C. Reed, A. G. Gassen, Charles W. Pauley, R. A. Thomas, and O. S. Hubbell. It was Hubbell who "cleared away the grainfields, pitched a tent, mapped out the lots, hired an auctioneer and started to work". A railway connected Pacific Beach with downtown San Diego starting in 1889, and was extended to La Jolla in 1894.

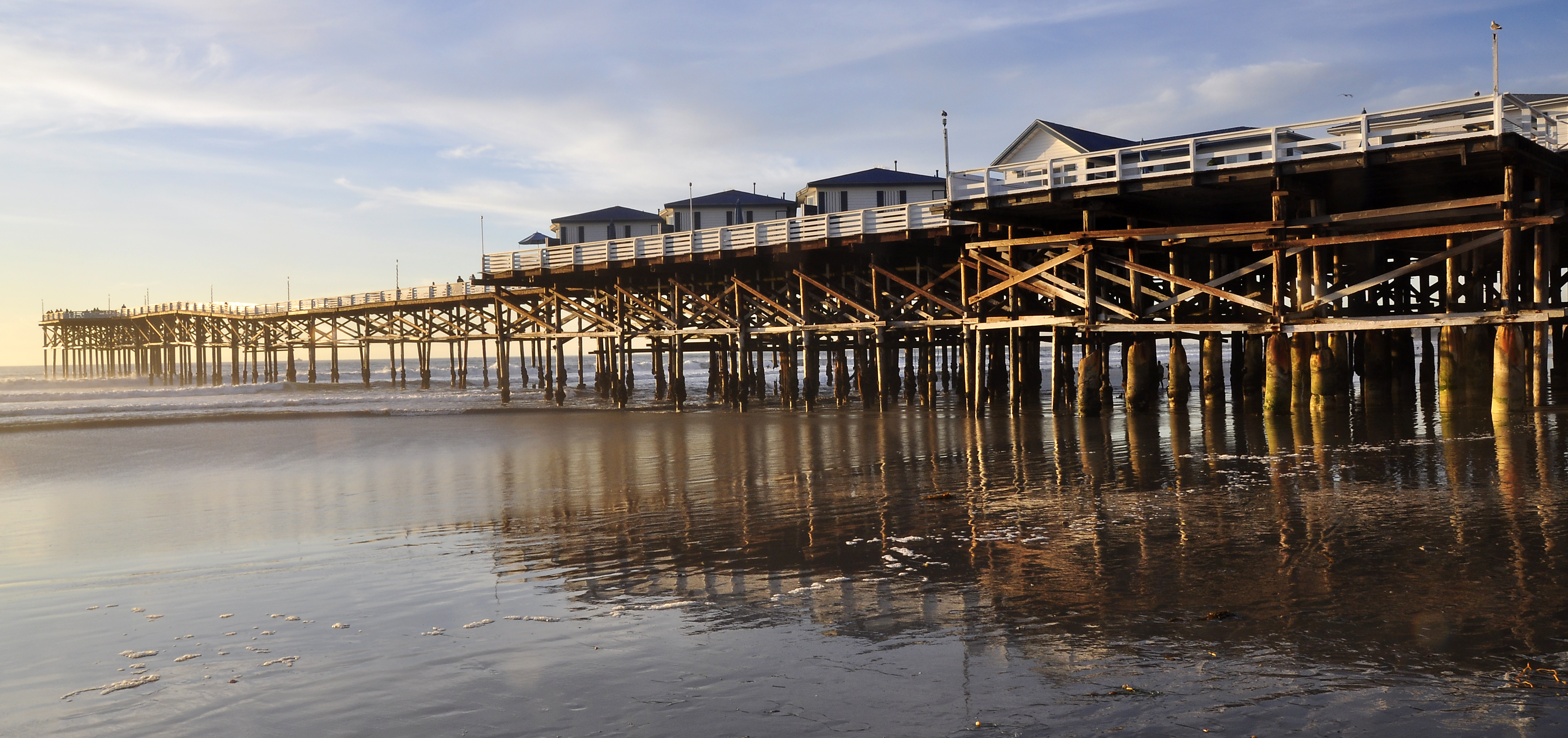
Crystal Pier, originally constructed in 1927

Early landmarks and attractions in Pacific Beach included an asbestos factory (established in 1888), a race track, and the San Diego College of Letters (1887–1891), none of which survive today. At the turn of the century, lemon growing and packing dominated the local economy. In 1910, the San Diego Army and Navy Academy, a preparatory school, was established in an old College building; in 1922 a public high school followed and a junior high in 1930. Crystal Pier construction in the 1920s shut down, and reopened in 1936. In 1927, Crystal Pier opened; the Roxy Movie theater opened in 1943 to cater to a population that grew five times during World War II. The postwar period saw the establishment of many hotels: the Bahia (1953), the Catamaran (1959), and Vacation Village (1965). High-rise construction in nearby Mission Bay led to the establishment of a 30-foot height limitation for buildings in 1972, an ordinance still in effect. Prominent boardwalk Ocean Avenue was closed in 1982 and became a park.

In 1902, lots sold for between $350–700 for oceanfront property. By 1950, the population of Pacific Beach reached 30,000 and the average home sold for $12,000. Nonetheless, a small number of farms remained. Today, homes can sell for millions of dollars.

Homelessness remains another pressing issue, Caryn Blanton highlighted, "There is no shelter and there is no housing right now. So what are we going to do as a community". According to the 2024 point-in-time count, in 2023 a 3% rise in homelessness affected the country with limited support. These challenges affect the community of Pacific Beach and its identity, as well as its adaptation to modern times. Long-term residents of Pacific Beach worry about the future, relating to drastic development plans and stress over the importance of homelessness.

In 1945, over 1,900 residents petitioned to remove the name of William Payne from the middle school because they did not believe that a black teacher deserved to be there. At the time, only two black families owned property in the neighborhood. In 2021, following a wave of name changes in the wake of the murder of George Floyd, San Diego Unified School Board voted to rename a joint-use field at the middle school after Payne and his wife Fannie.

The United States Navy operated an anti-aircraft training center at Pacific Beach during World War II. During the 1960s, development continued to increase with the city's investment in Mission Bay Park, including the developments of the Islandia, Vacation Village and Hilton Hotels. In 1964, SeaWorld opened south of Pacific Beach.

The original name of this feature was "Bay Point" and today one may still find a USGS bench mark and associated RM (DC1025, DC1026 respectively) with that name there. The "Bay Point Formation" is the name of a local rock stratum first found and described there.

On Wikipedia Day, 2001, Wikipedia began on a server in Pacific Beach at the Bomis office.

=== Patriot March riot and “Antifa” trial ===
In January 2021, about 100 Proud Boys and Trump supporters holding a “Patriot March” clashed with counter-protesters for hours on Mission Boulevard near the Crystal Pier. Violent acts committed by members of both sides were posted to social media. In 2022, 11 people, who were later identified by prosecutor Summer Stephan as “Antifa”, were charged with felonies related to the incident. In April 2024, nine of those charged had pled guilty to various charges while two chose to go to trial. On May 3, these two were convicted of conspiracy to commit a riot. In June 2024, eight of those who were convicted received sentences ranging from 180 days in jail to eight years in prison.

== Geography ==
=== The beach ===
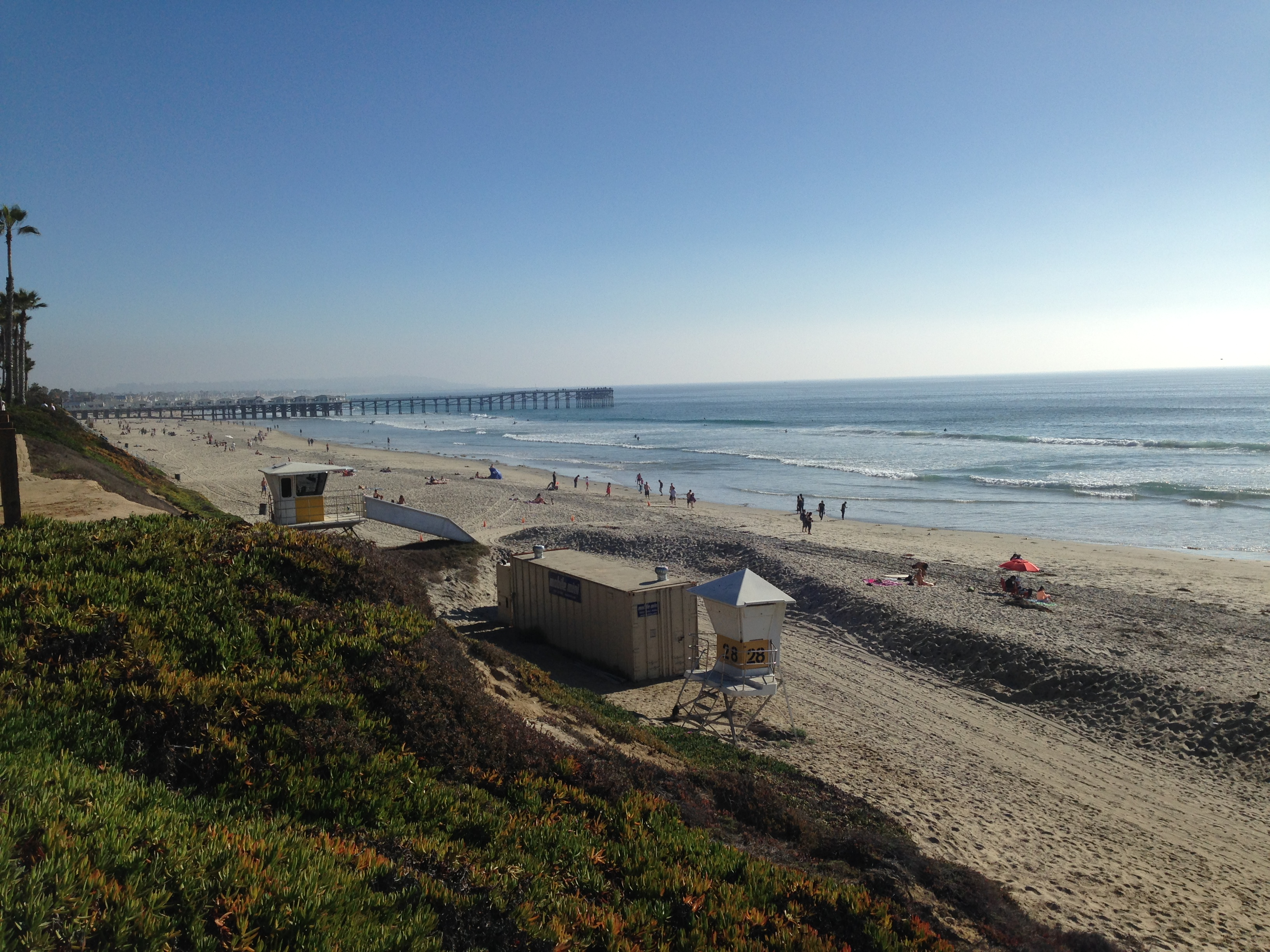
looking down the cliffs overlooking Pacific Beach north of Crystal Pier

The beach stretches for miles from the Mission Bay jetty to the cliffs of La Jolla. The boardwalk, officially called Ocean Front Walk/Ocean Boulevard, is a pedestrian walkway that runs approximately 3.2 miles along the beach from the end of Law St. in the north down into Mission Beach, ending at the mouth of Mission Bay in the south. There are numerous local shops, bars, hotels, and restaurants along the boardwalk, and it is generally crowded with pedestrians, cyclists, rollerbladers, skateboarders and shoppers. Adjacent to the boardwalk is the Crystal Pier, a public pier and hotel at the west end of Garnet Avenue. San Diego City Council banned the use of all electric-motor scooters in December 2019.

=== Streets ===
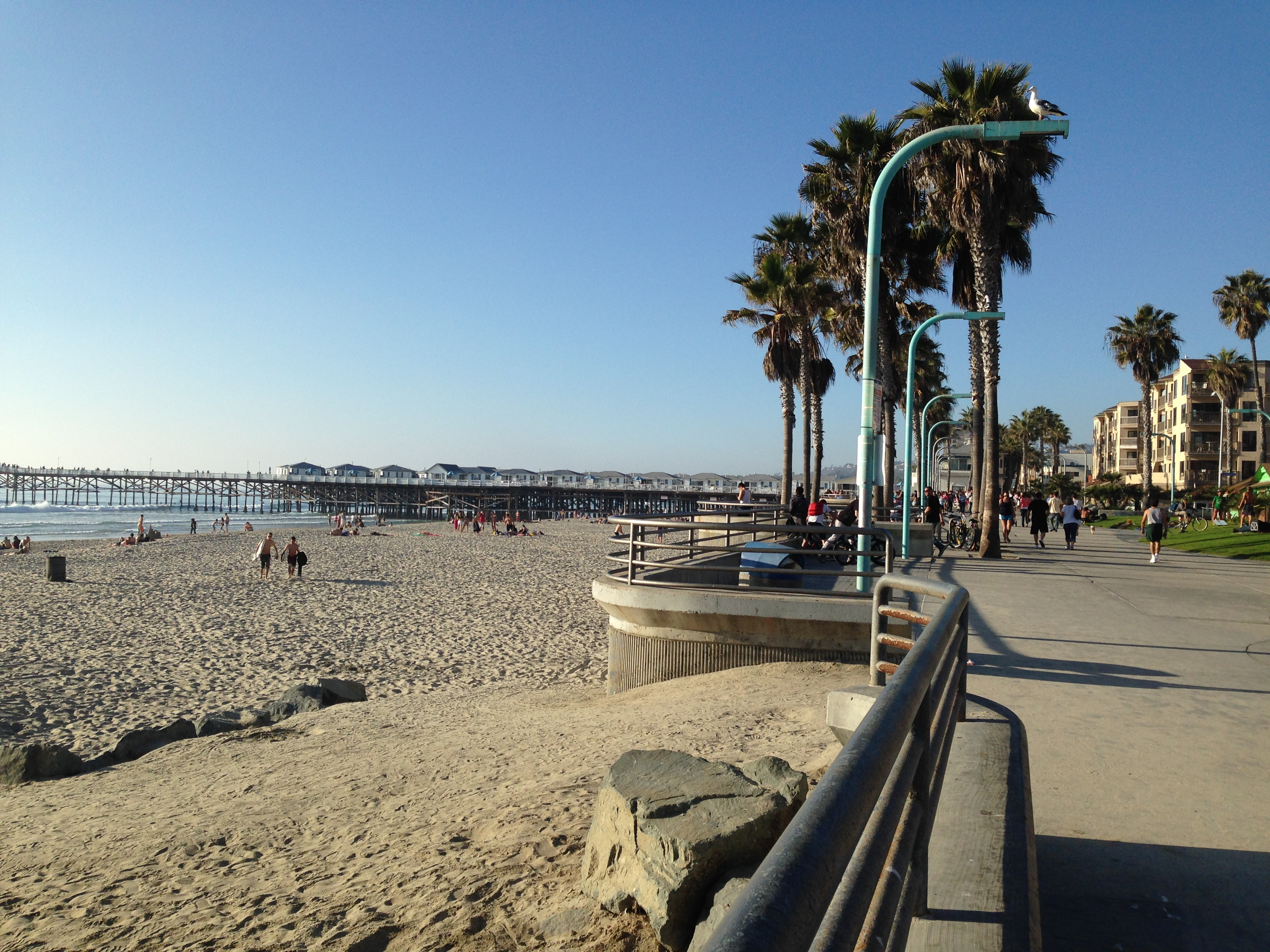
The beach near the boardwalk and pier

The streets in Pacific Beach were renamed several times before receiving their current designations in 1900. The primary north-south street running parallel to the beach is Mission Blvd., with the streets named after late 19th century federal officials, then incrementing in alphabetical order as they move further from the coast: Bayard, Cass, Dawes, Everts, Fanuel, Gresham, Haines, Ingraham, Jewell, Kendall, Lamont, Morrell, Noyes, Olney, Pendleton, Quincy, and Randall. Mission Boulevard was formerly Allison Street, being the "A" street of the series. Ingraham was initially named Broadway (1887), then was changed to Izard (1900), back to Broadway (1907) and finally settled as Ingraham Street in 1913.

The east-west streets are mostly named after precious stones. Starting at the north end of Mission Blvd. and heading south, the streets are:

- Agate
- Turquoise
- Sapphire
- Tourmaline - see Tourmaline Surfing Park
- Opal
- Loring
- Wilbur
- Beryl
- Law
- Chalcedony - pronounced locally "chal-SED-nee" or "CHAL-sə-doh-nee", unlike the stone: "kal-SED-n-ee"
- Missouri
- Diamond
- Emerald
- Felspar - an alternate spelling of "Feldspar" that has fallen out of use
- Garnet - pronounced locally with the second syllable accented, /ɡɑːrˈnɛt/, unlike the pronunciation of the stone
- Hornblend - spelled differently from the mineral hornblende
- Grand
- Thomas
- Reed
- Oliver
- Pacific Beach Drive

=== Climate ===
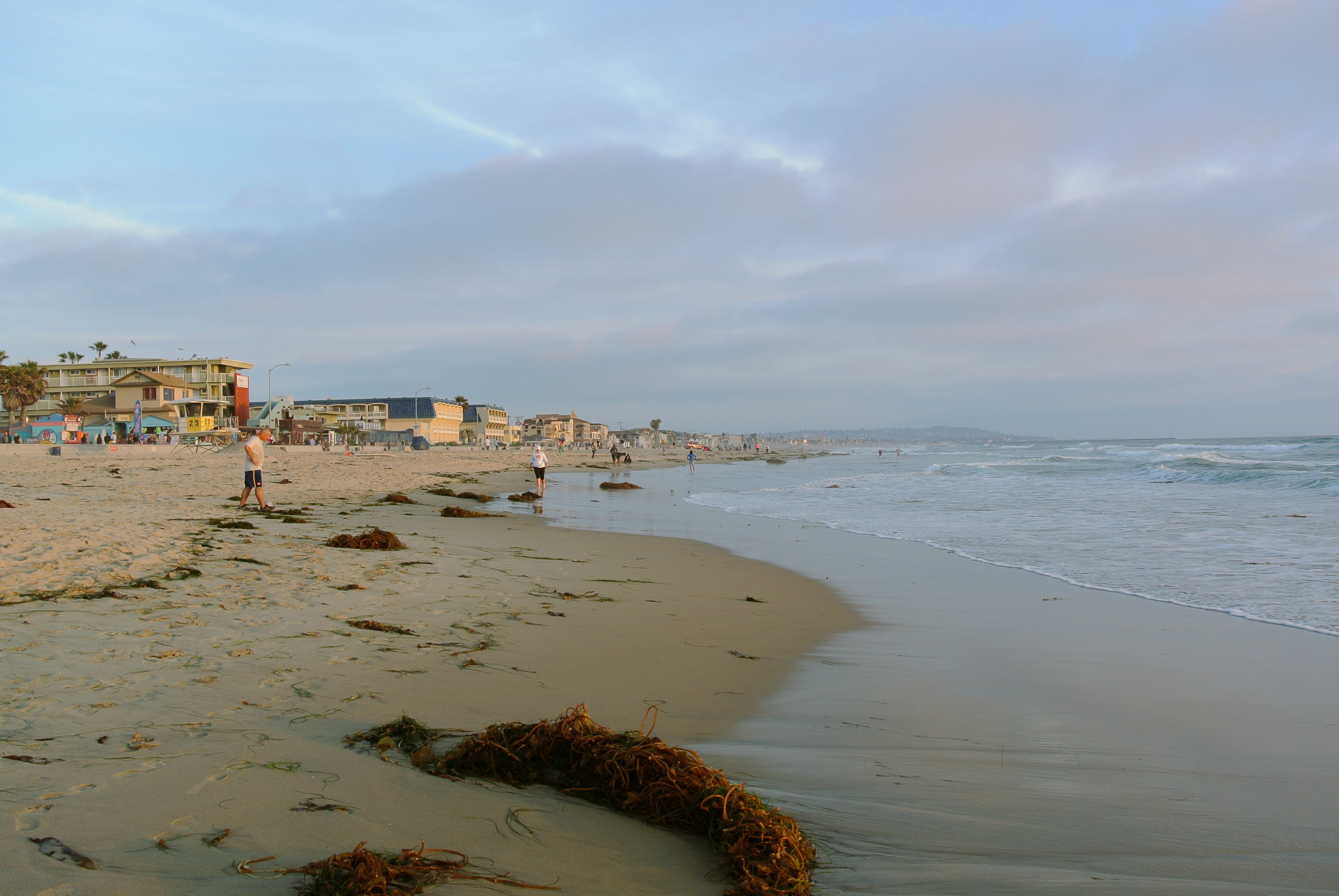
Pacific Beach on an overcast day

Pacific Beach has a semi-arid subtropical climate (Köppen climate classification: BSk) with warm-summer Mediterranean characteristics. The sun shines more than 300 days each year in Pacific Beach, and rainfall averages less than 11 inches per year.

Climate data for Pacific Beach, San Diego
Month	Jan	Feb	Mar	Apr	May	Jun	Jul	Aug	Sep	Oct	Nov	Dec	Year
Record high °F (°C)	89 (32)	91 (33)	95 (35)	99 (37)	101 (38)	103 (39)	108 (42)	104 (40)	108 (42)	107 (42)	97 (36)	87 (31)	108 (42)
Mean daily maximum °F (°C)	65.6 (18.7)	65.7 (18.7)	65.8 (18.8)	68.3 (20.2)	69.0 (20.6)	71.0 (21.7)	74.5 (23.6)	76.0 (24.4)	75.5 (24.2)	72.6 (22.6)	69.1 (20.6)	65.2 (18.4)	69.9 (21.1)
Mean daily minimum °F (°C)	48.9 (9.4)	50.6 (10.3)	53.1 (11.7)	55.8 (13.2)	59.5 (15.3)	61.9 (16.6)	65.4 (18.6)	66.7 (19.3)	64.7 (18.2)	60.5 (15.8)	53.6 (12.0)	48.5 (9.2)	57.4 (14.1)
Record low °F (°C)	30 (−1)	32 (0)	39 (4)	40 (4)	47 (8)	51 (11)	57 (14)	57 (14)	54 (12)	42 (6)	36 (2)	34 (1)	30 (−1)
Average precipitation inches (mm)	2.24 (57)	2.08 (53)	2.12 (54)	0.73 (19)	0.21 (5.3)	0.09 (2.3)	0.03 (0.76)	0.10 (2.5)	0.22 (5.6)	0.39 (9.9)	1.04 (26)	1.27 (32)	10.51 (267)

== Parks and recreation ==
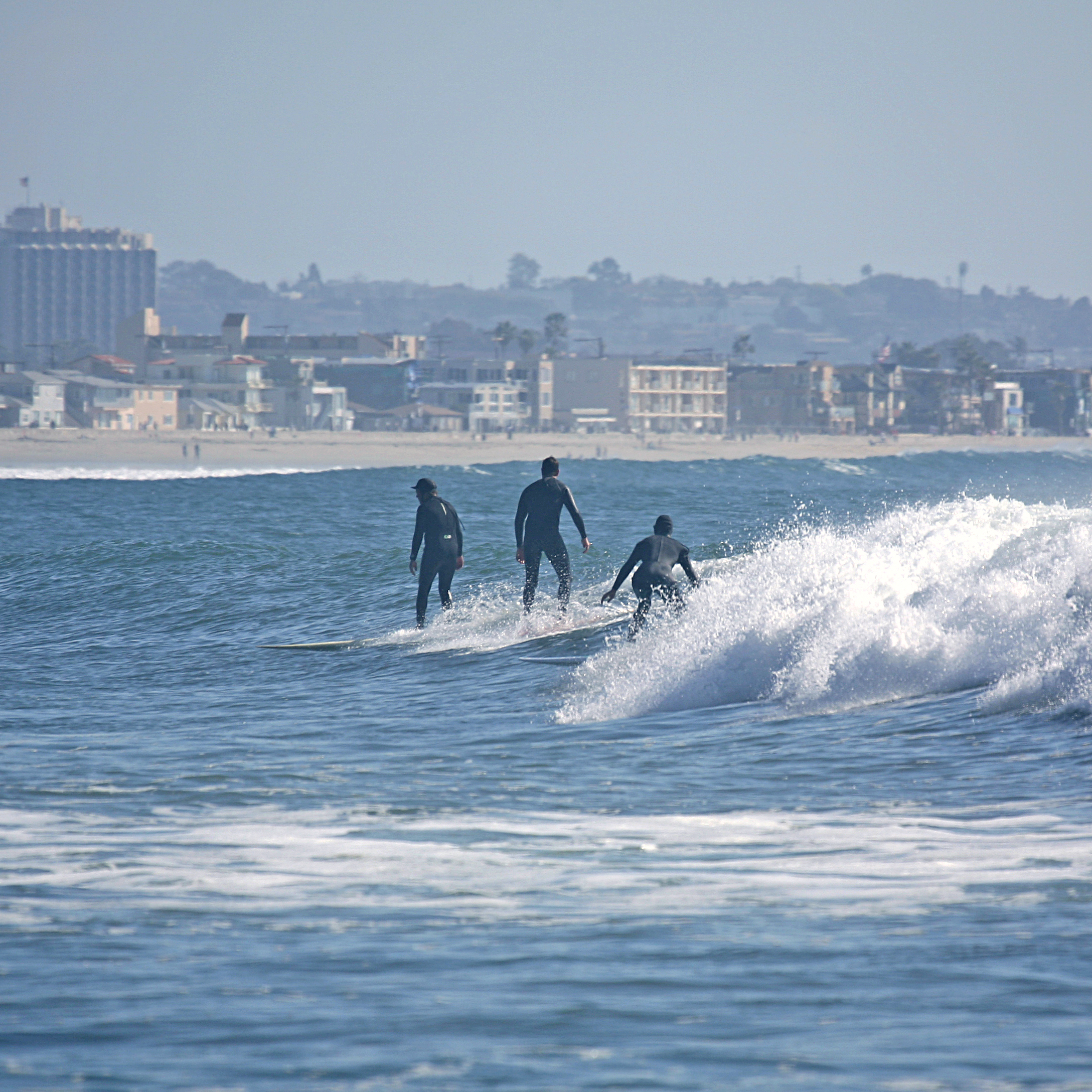
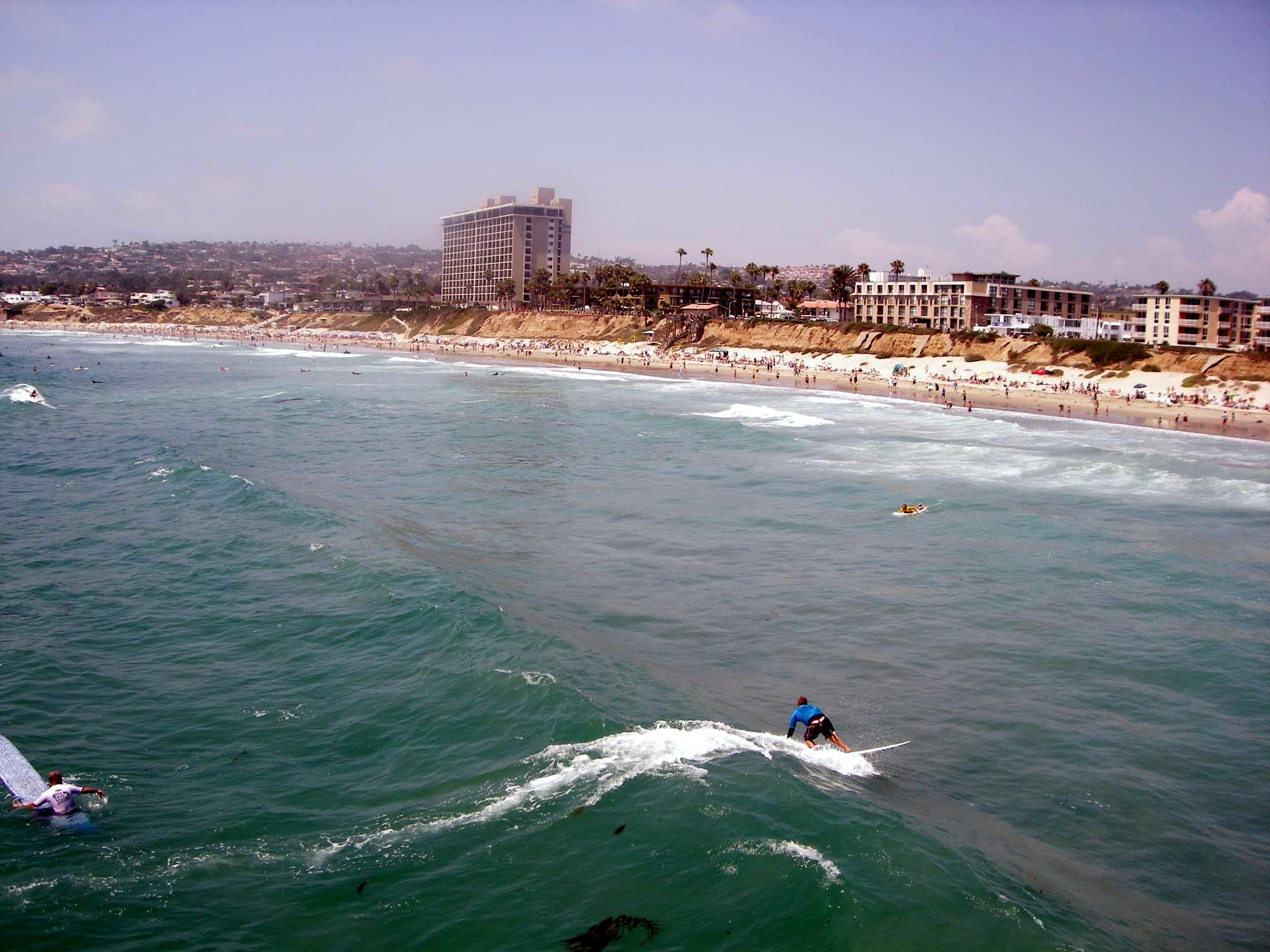
Surfing at Pacific Beach

In addition to bordering the Pacific Ocean and Mission Bay Park, Pacific Beach includes Kate Sessions Park and the Pacific Beach Recreation Center. Kate Sessions Park has a playground, a large lawn with ocean views, and a many-acre unmaintained area used for hiking and mountain biking. Fanuel Street Park is a popular bay-front park with playground equipment suitable for toddlers and school-age children. Rose Creek, which flows through Pacific Beach before emptying into Mission Bay, provides open space and a rich wetland area.

=== Surfing ===
Pacific Beach is open to all surfers. The level of difficulty is intermediate and can be surfed all year. The south wind makes surfing best though in the fall and winter. Many surfers wear dry or wetsuits as the water is in the high 50s in the winter and high 60s to low 70s in the summer.

== Organizations ==
The nonprofit Pacific Beach Town Council promotes the area and organizes community events. Save Pacific Beach is residents working together to better the community. The Pacific Beach Planning Group advises the city on land use and other issues. The Pacific Beach and Mission Bay Visitor Center provides information on the Pacific Beach Town Council, special events, lodging, dining, and Pacific Beach history. Service clubs include Kiwanis, Rotary, Lions Club, Girl Scouts, Pacific Beach Woman's Club, Surf Club, Friends of the PB Library, PB Garden Club, and Toastmasters.

The International Society for Krishna Consciousness (ISKCON) have been practicing at a temple in Pacific Beach since 1977.

== Education ==
Pacific Beach public schools are part of San Diego Unified School District. They include Mission Bay High School, Pacific Beach Middle School, Pacific Beach Elementary, Kate Sessions Elementary, Barnard Elementary, and Crown Point Junior Music Academy.

== Media ==
Pacific Beach is serviced in print by the daily San Diego Union Tribune and the weekly Beach & Bay Press.

On February 1st 2012, a man named Dylan Dessureault emailed some photos to the Vice team of a strange corpse. It was seen at Pacific Beach San Diego, and was described as a “Chupacabra/Montauk Monster-looking creature”. Another person named Josh Menard, who was a friend of Dylan, would later describe the creature having “the body shape of a pig—kind of a fat stomach, middle area. And the canines were just ridiculously large.” They would later make a video of this subject and possibilities on how the corpse ended up there.

== In popular culture ==
In John Dos Passos's The 42nd Parallel (1930), Fainy "Mac" McCreary briefly lives in a bungalow in Pacific Beach with his wife Maisie and their daughter Rose.

Love All You Have Left was filmed at a private residence in Pacific Beach.

Pacific Beach is featured in the seventh part of JoJo's Bizarre Adventure as the starting point of the Steel Ball Run race from San Diego to New York.

== Notable people ==
- Caroline Amiguet, actress
- Frank Bompensiero, mobster
- Vinny Curran, actor and co-owner of Thrusters Lounge
- Roger Guy English, businessman and world record holder
- Donna Frye, former city council representative and mayoral candidate
- Skip Frye, professional surfer
- Adam Gnade, musician and author
- Tony Gwynn Jr., former outfielder in the MLB
- Robert Hays, actor best known for his role in Airplane!
- Mark Whitney Mehran, owner of Hot Rod Surf
- Italo Scanga, artist and art professor
- Kate Sessions, landscape architect
- Rose Hartwick Thorpe, poet and writer

== Gallery ==
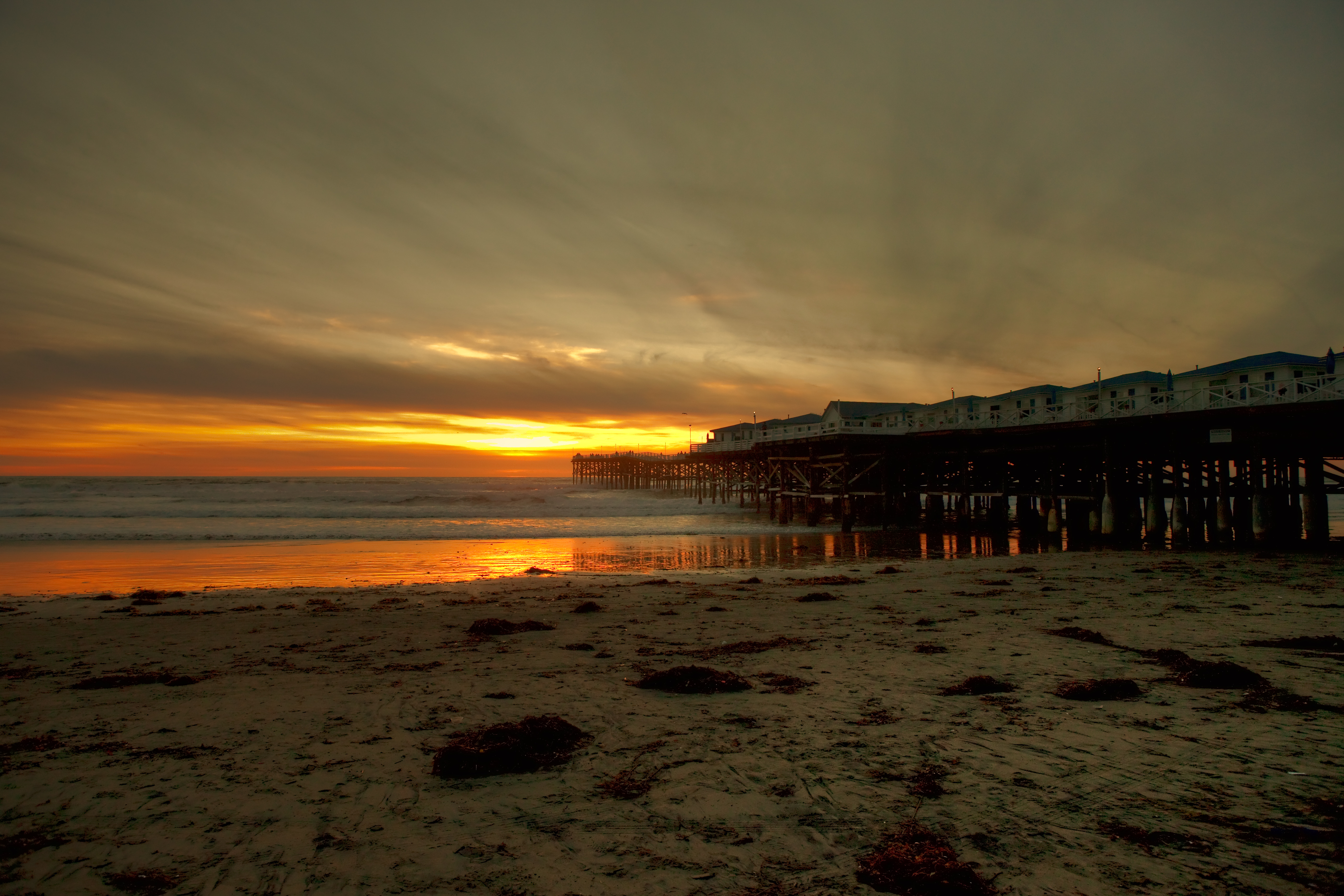
The Crystal Pier at sunset

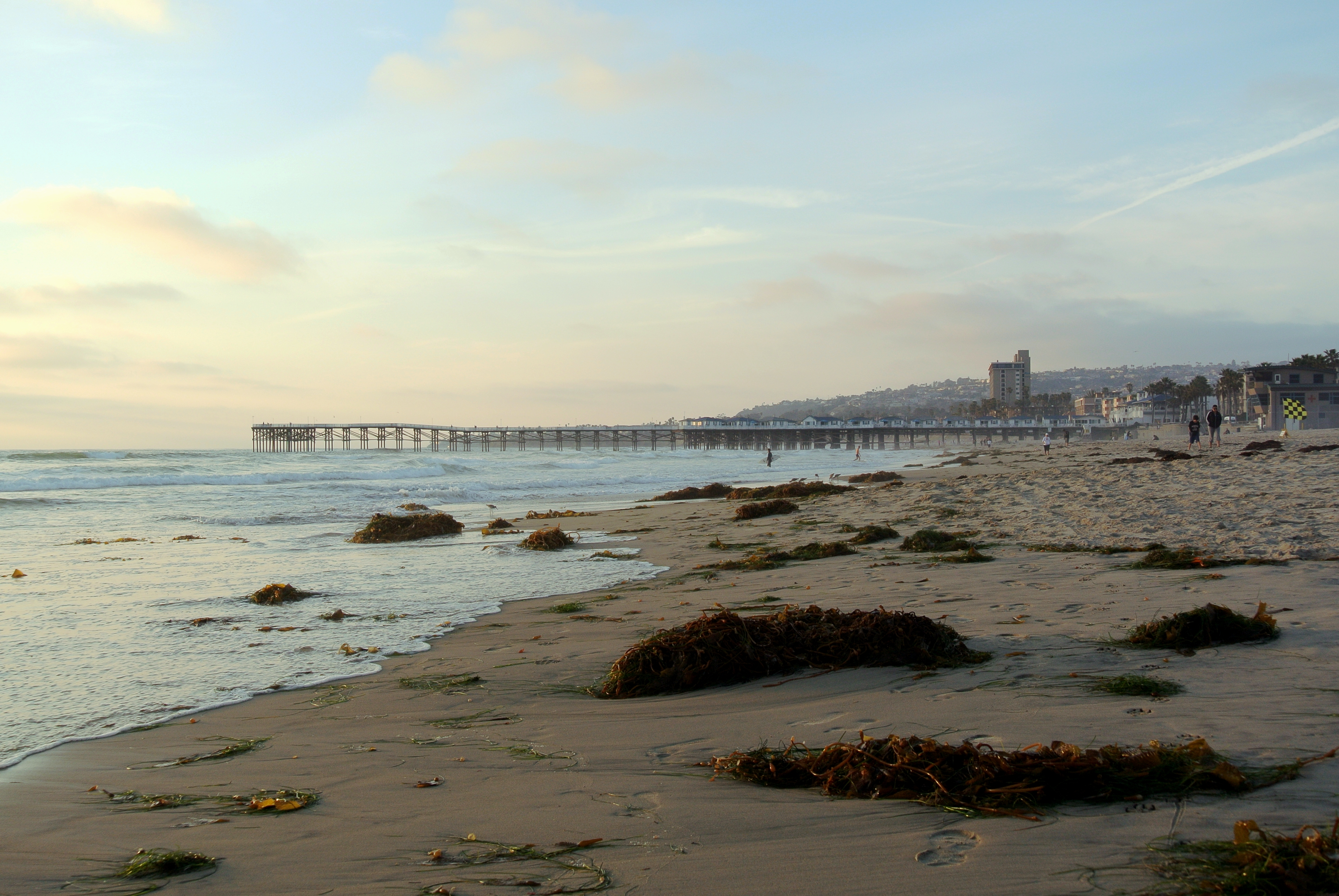
Pacific Beach looking north, Crystal Pier in the distance

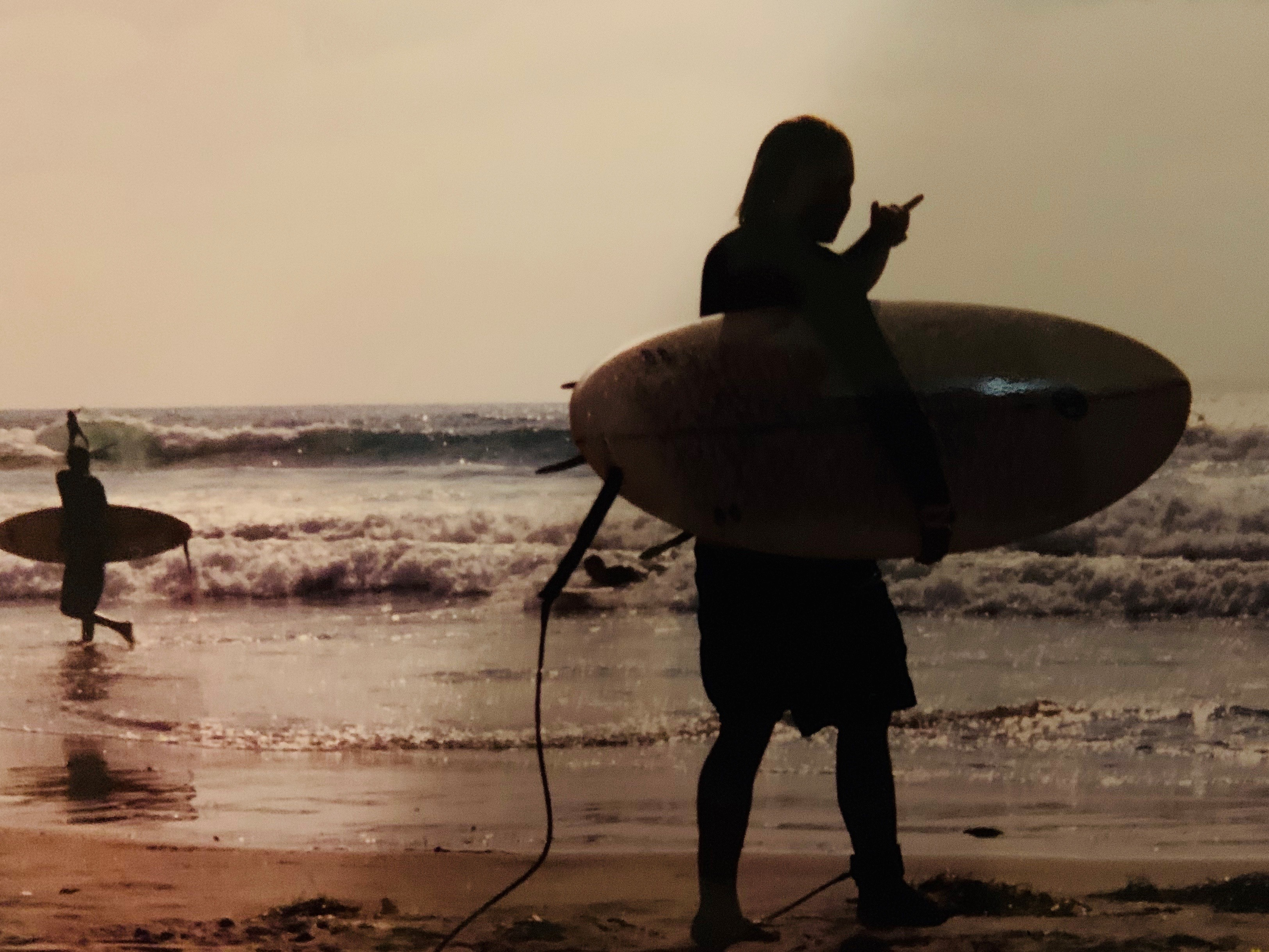
Surfers at Crystal Pier in Pacific Beach, California.

== See also ==
- Tourmaline Surfing Park at the north end of Pacific Beach
- List of beaches in San Diego County
- List of California state parks

To the North: La Jolla	California beaches	To the South; Mission Beach

To the North: Tourmaline Surfing Park	California beaches	To the South; Mission Beach, San Diego
