= January 10 =

January 10 this year in various calendars
- Saturday, 10 January 2026
Akan	Monomemene
Armenian	24 Arach 1475
Aztec	Huei Tozoztli 20, 1 Tōchtli
Babylonian	20 Kislimu, 2336 SE
Balinese pawukon	Menga, Kajeng, Menala, Paing, Maulu, Saniscara of Merakih, Yama, Erangan, Dewa
Bengali	26 Poush, BS 1432
Chinese	Yang Wood Monkey・Root Mansion; Wood Snake Year, Month 11, Day 22 (Xiaohan, 10 days until Dahan)
Common Era	10 January 2026 CE
Coptic	2 Tobi, AM 1742
Egyptian	29 Pachon, 2774 NE
Ethiopian	2 Ṭer, 2018 Amätä Məhrät
French Republican	Décade III, Primidi de Nivôse de l'Année 234 de la République
Gregorian	10 January, AD 2026
Hebrew	21 Tevet, AM 5786
Hindu	Hasta・Atigaṇḍa; Solar: 26 Pauṣa, 1947 SE; Lunisolar: Saptamī, Kṛishna pakṣa of Pauṣa, 2082 VE; Siddhārthin・5126 KY・1,872,585
Icelandic	Laugardagur, 18 Mörsugur 2025
Islamic	21 Rajab, AH 1447 (using tabular method)
ISO week date	2026-W02-6
Japanese	22 Shimotsuki, Reiwa 8 (Shōkan, 10 days until Daikan)
Julian	28 December, AD 2025 (AM 7535)
Julian day	2461051
Korean	22 Jwidal, 4358 DE
Maya	13.0.13.4.8; 6 Muan, 1 Lamat
Roman	ante diem V Kalendas Ianuarias, MMDCCLXXIX AUC
Solar Hijri	20 Dey, SH 1404
Tibetan	22 mgo, shing mo sbrul 2152 or 1771 or 999

<<	January					>>
Su	Mo	Tu	We	Th	Fr	Sa
				1	2	3
4	5	6	7	8	9	10
11	12	13	14	15	16	17
18	19	20	21	22	23	24
25	26	27	28	29	30	31
2026

January 10 in recent years
2026 (Saturday)
2025 (Friday)
2024 (Wednesday)
2023 (Tuesday)
2022 (Monday)
2021 (Sunday)
2020 (Friday)
2019 (Thursday)
2018 (Wednesday)
2017 (Tuesday)

January 10 is the 10th day of the year in the Gregorian calendar; 355 days remain until the end of the year (356 in leap years).

== Events ==
=== Pre-1600 ===
- 49 BC – Julius Caesar crosses the Rubicon, signalling the start of civil war.
- 9 – The Western Han dynasty ends when Wang Mang claims that the divine Mandate of Heaven called for the end of the dynasty and the beginning of his own, the Xin dynasty.
- 69 – Lucius Calpurnius Piso Licinianus is appointed by Galba as deputy Roman Emperor.
- 236 – Pope Fabian succeeds Anterus to become the twentieth pope of Rome.
- 1072 – Robert Guiscard conquers Palermo in Sicily for the Normans.
- 1430 – Philip the Good, the Duke of Burgundy, establishes the Order of the Golden Fleece, the most prestigious, exclusive, and expensive order of chivalry in the world.
- 1475 – Stephen III of Moldavia defeats the Ottoman Empire at the Battle of Vaslui.

=== 1601–1900 ===
- 1645 – Archbishop William Laud is beheaded for treason at the Tower of London.
- 1776 – American Revolution: Thomas Paine publishes his pamphlet Common Sense.
- 1791 – The Siege of Dunlap's Station begins near Cincinnati during the Northwest Indian War.
- 1812 – The first steamboat on the Ohio River or the Mississippi River arrives in New Orleans, 82 days after departing from Pittsburgh.
- 1861 – American Civil War: Florida becomes the third state to secede from the Union.
- 1863 – The Metropolitan Railway, the world's oldest underground railway, opens between Paddington and Farringdon, marking the beginning of the London Underground.
- 1870 – John D. Rockefeller incorporates Standard Oil.
- 1876 – The Plan of Tuxtepec is announced.

=== 1901–present ===
- 1901 – The first great Texas oil gusher is discovered at Spindletop in Beaumont, Texas.
- 1901 – New York: Automobile Club of America installs signs on major highways.
- 1916 – World War I: Imperial Russia begins the Erzurum Offensive, leading to the defeat of the Ottoman Empire's Third Army.
- 1917 – Imperial Trans-Antarctic Expedition: Seven survivors of the Ross Sea party are rescued after being stranded for several months.
- 1920 – The Treaty of Versailles takes effect, officially ending World War I for all combatant nations except the United States.
- 1920 – League of Nations Covenant automatically enters into force after the Treaty of Versailles is ratified by Germany.
- 1927 – Fritz Lang's futuristic film Metropolis is released in Germany.
- 1941 – World War II: The Greek army captures Kleisoura.
- 1946 – The first General Assembly of the United Nations assembles in the Methodist Central Hall, Westminster. Fifty-one nations are represented.
- 1946 – The United States Army Signal Corps successfully conducts Project Diana, bouncing radio waves off the Moon and receiving the reflected signals.
- 1954 – BOAC Flight 781, a de Havilland DH.106 Comet 1, explodes and falls into the Tyrrhenian Sea, killing 35 people.
- 1966 – Tashkent Declaration, a peace agreement between India and Pakistan signed that resolved the Indo-Pakistani War of 1965.
- 1972 – Sheikh Mujibur Rahman returns to the newly independent Bangladesh as president after spending over nine months in prison in Pakistan.
- 1980 – The New England Journal of Medicine publishes the letter Addiction Rare in Patients Treated with Narcotics, which is later misused to downplay the general risk of addiction to opioids.
- 1981 – Salvadoran Civil War: The FMLN launches its first major offensive, gaining control of most of Morazán and Chalatenango departments.
- 1984 – Holy See–United States relations: The United States and Holy See (Vatican City) re-establish full diplomatic relations after almost 117 years, overturning the United States Congress's 1867 ban on public funding for such a diplomatic envoy.
- 1985 – Sandinista Daniel Ortega becomes president of Nicaragua and vows to continue the transformation to socialism and alliance with the Soviet Union and Cuba.
- 1990 – Time Warner is formed by the merger of Time Inc. and Warner Communications.
- 2000 – Crossair Flight 498, a Saab 340 aircraft, crashes in Niederhasli, Switzerland, after taking off from Zurich Airport, killing 13 people.
- 2003 – North Korea withdraws from the Treaty on the Non-Proliferation of Nuclear Weapons, making it the first state to withdraw from the treaty.
- 2007 – A general strike begins in Guinea in an attempt to get President Lansana Conté to resign.
- 2012 – A bombing at Jamrud in Pakistan, kills at least 30 people and injures 78 others.
- 2013 – More than 100 people are killed and 270 injured in several bomb blasts in the Quetta area of Pakistan.
- 2015 – A traffic accident between an oil tanker truck and passenger coach en route to Shikarpur from Karachi on the Pakistan National Highway Link Road near Gulshan-e-Hadeed, Karachi, killing at least 62 people.
- 2019 – A 13-year-old American girl, Jayme Closs, is found alive in Gordon, Wisconsin, having been kidnapped 88 days earlier from her parents' home whilst they were murdered.

== Births ==
=== Pre-1600 ===
- 626 – Husayn ibn Ali, the third Shia Imam (died 680)
- 1480 – Margaret of Austria, Duchess of Savoy (died 1530)
- 1538 – Louis of Nassau (died 1574)

=== 1601–1900 ===
- 1607 – Isaac Jogues, French priest and missionary (died 1646)
- 1644 – Louis François, duc de Boufflers, French general (died 1711)
- 1654 – Joshua Barnes, English historian and scholar (died 1712)
- 1702 – Johannes Zick, German painter (died 1762)
- 1715 – Christian August Crusius, German philosopher and theologian (died 1775)
- 1750 – Thomas Erskine, 1st Baron Erskine, Scottish-English lawyer and politician, Lord Chancellor of Great Britain (died 1823)
- 1760 – Johann Rudolf Zumsteeg, German composer and conductor (died 1802)
- 1769 – Michel Ney, French general (died 1815)
- 1776 – George Birkbeck, English physician and academic, founded Birkbeck, University of London (died 1841)
- 1780 – Martin Lichtenstein, German physician and explorer (died 1857)
- 1802 – Carl Ritter von Ghega, Italian-Austrian engineer, designed the Semmering railway (died 1860)
- 1810 – Ferdinand Barbedienne, French engineer (died 1892)
- 1810 – Jeremiah S. Black, American jurist and politician, 23rd United States Secretary of State (died 1883)
- 1810 – William Haines, English-Australian politician, 1st Premier of Victoria (died 1866)
- 1823 – Haji Zeynalabdin Taghiyev, Azerbaijani national industrial magnate and philanthropist (died 1924)
- 1827 – Amanda Cajander, Finnish medical reformer (died 1871)
- 1828 – Herman Koeckemann, German bishop and missionary (died 1892)
- 1829 – Epameinondas Deligeorgis, Greek lawyer, journalist and politician, Prime Minister of Greece (died 1879)
- 1834 – John Dalberg-Acton, 1st Baron Acton, Italian-English historian and politician (died 1902)
- 1840 – Louis-Nazaire Bégin, Canadian cardinal (died 1925)
- 1842 – Luigi Pigorini, Italian paleontologist, archaeologist, and ethnographer (died 1925)
- 1843 – Frank James, American soldier and criminal (died 1915)
- 1848 – Reinhold Sadler, American merchant and politician, 9th governor of Nevada (died 1906)
- 1849 – Robert Crosbie, Canadian theosophist, founded the United Lodge of Theosophists (died 1919)
- 1850 – John Wellborn Root, American architect, designed the Rookery Building and Monadnock Building (died 1891)
- 1853 – Jessie Bond, mezzo-soprano roles in Gilbert and Sullivan comic operas.(died 1942)
- 1854 – Ramón Corral, Mexican general and politician, 6th Vice President of Mexico (died 1912)
- 1858 – Heinrich Zille, German illustrator and photographer (died 1929)
- 1859 – Francesc Ferrer i Guàrdia, Spanish philosopher and academic (died 1909)
- 1860 – Charles G. D. Roberts, Canadian poet and author (died 1943)
- 1864 – Grand Duke Peter Nikolaevich of Russia (died 1931)
- 1873 – Algernon Maudslay, English sailor (died 1948)
- 1873 – Jack O'Neill, Irish-American baseball player (died 1935)
- 1873 – George Orton, Canadian runner and hurdler (died 1958)
- 1875 – Issai Schur, German mathematician and academic (died 1941)
- 1877 – Frederick Gardner Cottrell, American physical chemist, inventor and philanthropist (died 1948)
- 1878 – John McLean, American hurdler, football player, and coach (died 1955)
- 1880 – Manuel Azaña, Spanish jurist and politician, 7th President of Spain (died 1940)
- 1883 – Francis X. Bushman, American actor, director, and screenwriter (died 1966)
- 1883 – Aleksey Nikolayevich Tolstoy, Russian journalist, author, and poet (died 1945)
- 1887 – Robinson Jeffers, American poet and philosopher (died 1962)
- 1890 – Pina Menichelli, Italian actress (died 1984)
- 1891 – Heinrich Behmann, German mathematician and academic (died 1970)
- 1891 – Ann Shoemaker, American actress (died 1978)
- 1892 – Dumas Malone, American historian and author (died 1986)
- 1892 – Melchior Wańkowicz, Polish soldier, journalist, and author (died 1974)
- 1893 – Albert Jacka, Australian captain, Victoria Cross recipient (died 1932)
- 1894 – Pingali Lakshmikantam, Indian poet and author (died 1972)
- 1895 – Percy Cerutty, Australian athletics coach (died 1975)
- 1896 – Yong Mun Sen, Malaysian watercolour painter (died 1962)
- 1896 – Dinkar G. Kelkar, Indian art collector (died 1990)
- 1898 – Katharine Burr Blodgett, American physicist and engineer (died 1979)
- 1900 – Violette Cordery, English racing driver (died 1983)

=== 1901–present ===
- 1903 – Barbara Hepworth, English sculptor (died 1975)
- 1903 – Voldemar Väli, Estonian wrestler (died 1997)
- 1904 – Ray Bolger, American actor and dancer (died 1987)
- 1907 – Gordon Kidd Teal, American engineer and inventor (died 2003)
- 1908 – Jaime Garcia Goulart, Portuguese Catholic missionary and bishop (died 1997)
- 1908 – Paul Henreid, Italian-American actor and director (died 1992)
- 1908 – Bernard Lee, English actor (died 1981)
- 1910 – Jean Martinon, French conductor and composer (died 1976)
- 1911 – Binod Bihari Chowdhury, Bangladeshi activist (died 2013)
- 1911 – Norman Heatley, English biologist and chemist (died 2004)
- 1912 – Della H. Raney, American Army Air Corps officer (died 1987)
- 1912 – Maria Mandl, Austrian Lagerführerin at Auschwitz koncentration camp (died 1948)
- 1913 – Gustáv Husák, Slovak politician, 9th President of Czechoslovakia (died 1991)
- 1913 – Mehmet Shehu, Albanian soldier and politician, 22nd Prime Minister of Albania (died 1981)
- 1914 – Yu Kuo-hwa, Chinese politician, 23rd Premier of the Republic of China (died 2000)
- 1915 – Dean Dixon, American-Swiss conductor (died 1976)
- 1915 – Cynthia Freeman, American author (died 1988)
- 1916 – Sune Bergström, Swedish biochemist and academic, Nobel Prize laureate (died 2004)
- 1916 – Eldzier Cortor, American painter (died 2015)
- 1916 – Don Metz, Canadian ice hockey player (died 2007)
- 1917 – Jerry Wexler, American journalist and producer (died 2008)
- 1918 – Les Bennett, English footballer and manager (died 1999)
- 1918 – Arthur Chung, Guyanese lawyer and politician, 1st President of Guyana (died 2008)
- 1919 – Terukuni Manzō, Japanese sumo wrestler, the 38th Yokozuna (died 1977)
- 1919 – Milton Parker, American businessman, co-founded the Carnegie Deli (died 2009)
- 1920 – Rosella Hightower, American ballerina (died 2008)
- 1920 – Roberto M. Levingston, Argentinian general and politician, 36th President of Argentina (died 2015)
- 1921 – Rodger Ward, American aviator, race car driver and sportscaster (died 2004)
- 1922 – Billy Liddell, Scottish-English footballer (died 2001)
- 1924 – Earl Bakken, American inventor (died 2018)
- 1924 – Ludmilla Chiriaeff, Canadian ballerina, choreographer, and director (died 1996)
- 1925 – Billie Sol Estes, American financier and businessman (died 2013)
- 1926 – Musallam Bseiso, Palestinian journalist and politician (died 2017)
- 1927 – Gisele MacKenzie, Canadian-American singer and actress (died 2003)
- 1927 – Johnnie Ray, American singer-songwriter and pianist (died 1990)
- 1927 – Otto Stich, Swiss lawyer and politician, 140th President of the Swiss Confederation (died 2012)
- 1928 – Philip Levine, American poet and academic (died 2015)
- 1928 – Peter Mathias, English historian and academic (died 2016)
- 1930 – Roy E. Disney, American businessman (died 2009)
- 1931 – Peter Barnes, English playwright and screenwriter (died 2004)
- 1931 – Rosalind Howells, Baroness Howells of St Davids, Grenadian-English academic and politician (died 2025)
- 1931 – Nik Abdul Aziz Nik Mat, Malaysian cleric and politician, 12th Menteri Besar of Kelantan (died 2015)
- 1932 – Lou Henson, American college basketball coach (died 2020)
- 1934 – Leonid Kravchuk, Ukrainian politician, 1st President of Ukraine (died 2022)
- 1935 – Ronnie Hawkins, American rockabilly singer-songwriter and guitarist (died 2022)
- 1935 – Sherrill Milnes, American opera singer and educator
- 1936 – Stephen E. Ambrose, American historian and author (died 2002)
- 1936 – Robert Woodrow Wilson, American physicist and astronomer, Nobel Prize laureate
- 1936 – Lucienne Stassaert, Belgian poet and painter (died 2026)
- 1938 – Elza Ibrahimova, Azerbaijani composer (died 2012)
- 1938 – Donald Knuth, American computer scientist and mathematician
- 1938 – Frank Mahovlich, Canadian ice hockey player and politician
- 1938 – Willie McCovey, American baseball player (died 2018)
- 1939 – David Horowitz, American writer and activist (died 2025)
- 1939 – Scott McKenzie, American singer-songwriter and guitarist (died 2012)
- 1939 – Sal Mineo, American actor (died 1976)
- 1939 – Bill Toomey, American athlete
- 1940 – Godfrey Hewitt, English geneticist and academic (died 2013)
- 1940 – K. J. Yesudas, Indian singer and music director
- 1941 – Tom Clarke, Scottish politician, Shadow Secretary of State for Scotland
- 1942 – Graeme Gahan, Australian footballer and coach (died 2018)
- 1943 – Jim Croce, American singer-songwriter (died 1973)
- 1944 – Jeffrey Catherine Jones, American comics and fantasy artist (died 2011)
- 1944 – William Sanderson, American actor
- 1944 – Frank Sinatra, Jr., American singer and actor (died 2016)
- 1945 – John Fahey, New Zealand-Australian lawyer and politician, 38th Premier of New South Wales (died 2020)
- 1945 – Rod Stewart, British singer-songwriter
- 1945 – Gunther von Hagens, German anatomist, invented plastination
- 1947 – George Alec Effinger, American author (died 2002)
- 1947 – James Morris, American opera singer
- 1947 – Peer Steinbrück, German politician, German Minister of Finance
- 1947 – Tiit Vähi, Estonian engineer and politician, 11th Prime Minister of Estonia
- 1948 – Remu Aaltonen, Finnish musician
- 1948 – Donald Fagen, American singer-songwriter and musician
- 1948 – Bernard Thévenet, French cyclist and sportscaster
- 1949 – Kemal Derviş, Turkish economist and politician, Turkish Minister of Economy (died 2023)
- 1949 – George Foreman, American boxer, actor, and businessman (died 2025)
- 1949 – Linda Lovelace, American pornographic actress and activist (died 2002)
- 1953 – Pat Benatar, American singer-songwriter
- 1953 – Bobby Rahal, American race car driver
- 1954 – Baba Vaziroglu, Azerbaijani writer, poet and translator
- 1955 – Michael Schenker, German musician and songwriter
- 1956 – Shawn Colvin, American singer-songwriter and guitarist
- 1956 – Antonio Muñoz Molina, Spanish author
- 1959 – Chandra Cheeseborough, American sprinter and coach
- 1959 – Chris Van Hollen, American lawyer and politician
- 1959 – Fran Walsh, New Zealand screenwriter and producer
- 1960 – Richard Bartle, British game designer and academic
- 1960 – Gurinder Chadha, Kenyan-English director, producer, and screenwriter
- 1960 – Brian Cowen, Irish lawyer and politician, 12th Taoiseach of Ireland
- 1960 – Benoît Pelletier, Canadian lawyer and politician (died 2024)
- 1961 – Evan Handler, American actor
- 1961 – Nadja Salerno-Sonnenberg, Italian-American violinist, author, and educator
- 1962 – Michael Fortier, Canadian lawyer and politician
- 1962 – Kathryn S. McKinley, American computer scientist and academic
- 1963 – Malcolm Dunford, New Zealand-Australian footballer
- 1963 – Kira Ivanova, Russian figure skater (died 2001)
- 1964 – Brad Roberts, Canadian singer-songwriter and guitarist
- 1966 – Jeremy Sims, Australian actor
- 1968 – Zoe Tay, Singaporean actress and model
- 1969 – Simone Bagel-Trah, German businessperson
- 1970 – Alisa Marić, Serbian chess player and politician, Serbian Minister of Youth and Sports
- 1972 – Mohammed Benzakour, Moroccan-Dutch journalist, poet, and author
- 1973 – Glenn Robinson, American basketball player
- 1973 – Félix Trinidad, Puerto Rican boxer
- 1974 – Jemaine Clement, New Zealand comedian, actor, and musician
- 1974 – Davide Dionigi, Italian footballer and manager
- 1974 – Steve Marlet, French footballer and coach
- 1974 – Bob Peeters, Belgian footballer and manager
- 1974 – Hrithik Roshan, Indian actor
- 1975 – Jake Delhomme, American football player
- 1976 – Khairy Jamaluddin, Malaysian politician, Malaysian Minister of Health
- 1976 – Adam Kennedy, American baseball player
- 1977 – A. J. Bramlett, American basketball player
- 1977 – Clark Haggans, American football player (died 2023)
- 1978 – Brent Smith, American singer and songwriter
- 1978 – Tamina Snuka, American wrestler
- 1978 – Johan van der Wath, South African cricketer
- 1979 – Simone Cavalli, Italian footballer
- 1979 – Silvia Kumpan-Takacs, Austrian politician
- 1979 – Henrik Tallinder, Swedish ice hockey player
- 1980 – Sarah Shahi, American actress
- 1980 – Rastislav Staňa, Slovak ice hockey player
- 1981 – Jared Kushner, American real estate investor and political figure
- 1981 – Belinda Snell, Australian basketball player
- 1982 – Julien Brellier, French footballer
- 1982 – Tomasz Brzyski, Polish footballer
- 1984 – Marouane Chamakh, Moroccan footballer
- 1984 – Ariane Friedrich, German high jumper
- 1984 – Kalki Koechlin, Indian actress
- 1985 – Robert Nilsson, Canadian-Swedish ice hockey player
- 1986 – Kirsten Flipkens, Belgian tennis player
- 1986 – Marcus Freeman, American football coach
- 1987 – César Cielo, Brazilian swimmer
- 1988 – Leonard Patrick Komon, Kenyan runner
- 1989 – Ali Gabr, Egyptian footballer
- 1990 – John Carlson, American ice hockey player
- 1990 – Martin Jones, Canadian ice hockey player
- 1990 – Ishiura Shikanosuke, Japanese sumo wrestler
- 1990 – Cody Walker, Australian rugby league player
- 1991 – Chad Townsend, Australian rugby league player
- 1993 – Tobias Rieder, German ice hockey player
- 1996 – Budda Baker, American football player
- 1996 – Matthew Dufty, Australian rugby league player
- 1996 – Dylan Edwards, Australian rugby league player
- 1996 – Ahmed Sayed, Egyptian footballer
- 1997 – Patrick Herbert, New Zealand rugby league player
- 1997 – Blake Lawrie, Australian rugby league player
- 1999 – Mason Mount, English footballer
- 1999 – Youssouf Fofana, French footballer
- 2000 – Erik Botheim, Norwegian footballer
- 2000 – Reneé Rapp, American singer-songwriter and actress
- 2001 – Santi Aldama, Spanish basketball player
- 2003 – Cesare Casadei, Italian footballer

== Deaths ==
=== Pre-1600 ===
- 259 – Polyeuctus, Roman saint
- 314 – Miltiades, pope of the Catholic Church
- 681 – Agatho, pope of the Catholic Church
- 976 – John I Tzimiskes, Byzantine emperor (born 925)
- 987 – Pietro I Orseolo, doge of Venice (born 928)
- 1055 – Bretislav I, duke of Bohemia
- 1094 – Al-Mustansir Billah, Egyptian caliph (born 1029)
- 1218 – Hugh I, king of Cyprus
- 1276 – Gregory X, pope of the Catholic Church (born c.1210)
- 1322 – Petrus Aureolus, scholastic philosopher
- 1358 – Abu Inan Faris, Marinid ruler of Morocco (born 1329)
- 1552 – Johann Cochlaeus, German humanist and controversialist (born 1479)

=== 1601–1900 ===
- 1645 – William Laud, English archbishop and academic (born 1573)
- 1654 – Nicholas Culpeper, English botanist, physician, and astrologer (born 1616)
- 1698 – Louis-Sébastien Le Nain de Tillemont, French priest and historian (born 1637)
- 1754 – Edward Cave, English publisher, founded The Gentleman's Magazine (born 1691)
- 1761 – Edward Boscawen, English admiral and politician (born 1711)
- 1778 – Carl Linnaeus, Swedish botanist and physician (born 1707)
- 1794 – Georg Forster, German-Polish ethnologist and journalist (born 1754)
- 1811 – Joseph Chénier, French poet, playwright, and politician (born 1764)
- 1824 – Victor Emmanuel I, duke of Savoy and king of Sardinia (born 1759)
- 1828 – François de Neufchâteau, French poet, academic, and politician, French Minister of the Interior (born 1750)
- 1829 – Gregorio Funes, Argentinian clergyman, historian, and educator (born 1749)
- 1843 – Dimitrie Macedonski, Greek-Romanian captain and politician (born 1780)
- 1851 – Karl Freiherr von Müffling, Prussian field marshal (born 1775)
- 1855 – Mary Russell Mitford, English author and playwright (born 1787)
- 1862 – Samuel Colt, American engineer and businessman, founded Colt's Manufacturing Company (born 1814)
- 1863 – Lyman Beecher, American minister and activist, co-founded the American Temperance Society (born 1775)
- 1895 – Benjamin Godard, French violinist and composer (born 1849)

=== 1901–present ===
- 1901 – James Dickson, English-Australian businessman and politician, 1st Australian Minister for Defence (born 1832)
- 1904 – Jean-Léon Gérôme, French painter and sculptor (born 1824)
- 1905 – Kārlis Baumanis, Latvian composer (born 1835)
- 1917 – Buffalo Bill, American soldier and hunter (born 1846)
- 1917 – Feliks Leparsky, Russian fencer and captain (born 1875)
- 1920 – Sali Nivica, Albanian journalist and politician (born 1890)
- 1922 – Frank Tudor, Australian politician, 6th Australian Minister for Trade and Investment (born 1866)
- 1926 – Eino Leino, Finnish poet and journalist (born 1878)
- 1935 – Edwin Flack, Australian tennis player and runner (born 1873)
- 1935 – Charlie McGahey, English cricketer and footballer (born 1871)
- 1941 – Frank Bridge, English viola player and composer (born 1879)
- 1941 – John Lavery, Irish painter and academic (born 1856)
- 1941 – Issai Schur, Belarusian-German mathematician and academic (born 1875)
- 1946 – Matti Turkia, Finnish politician (born 1871)
- 1949 – Erich von Drygalski, German geographer and geophysicist (born 1865)
- 1951 – Sinclair Lewis, American novelist, short-story writer, and playwright, Nobel Prize laureate (born 1885)
- 1951 – Yoshio Nishina, Japanese physicist and academic (born 1890)
- 1954 – Chester Wilmot, American journalist and historian (born 1911)
- 1956 – Zonia Baber, American geographer and geologist (born 1862)
- 1957 – Gabriela Mistral, Chilean poet and academic, Nobel Prize laureate (born 1889)
- 1959 – Şükrü Kaya, Turkish jurist and politician, Turkish Minister of Foreign Affairs (born 1883)
- 1960 – Jack Laviolette, Canadian ice hockey player, coach, and manager (born 1879)
- 1961 – Dashiell Hammett, American detective novelist and screenwriter (born 1894)
- 1967 – Charles E. Burchfield, American painter (born 1893)
- 1968 – Ali Fuat Cebesoy, Turkish general and politician, 6th Speaker of the Parliament of Turkey (born 1882)
- 1969 – Sampurnanand, Indian educator and politician, 2nd Governor of Rajasthan (born 1891)
- 1970 – Pavel Belyayev, Russian pilot and astronaut (born 1925)
- 1971 – Coco Chanel, French fashion designer, founded Chanel (born 1883)
- 1971 – Ignazio Giunti, Italian racing driver (born 1941)
- 1972 – Aksel Larsen, Danish lawyer and politician (born 1897)
- 1976 – Howlin' Wolf, American singer-songwriter and guitarist (born 1910)
- 1978 – Pedro Joaquín Chamorro Cardenal, Nicaraguan journalist and author (born 1924)
- 1978 – Don Gillis, American composer and conductor (born 1912)
- 1978 – Hannah Gluckstein, British painter (born 1895)
- 1981 – Fawn M. Brodie, American historian and author (born 1915)
- 1984 – Souvanna Phouma, Laotian politician, 8th Prime Minister of Laos (born 1901)
- 1986 – Jaroslav Seifert, Czech journalist and poet, Nobel Prize laureate (born 1901)
- 1987 – Marion Hutton, American singer (born 1919)
- 1987 – David Robinson, English businessman and philanthropist (born 1904)
- 1989 – Herbert Morrison, American journalist and producer (born 1905)
- 1990 – Tochinishiki Kiyotaka, Japanese sumo wrestler, the 44th Yokozuna (born 1925)
- 1992 – Roberto Bonomi, Argentinian racing driver (born 1919)
- 1995 – Kathleen Tynan, Canadian-English journalist, author, and screenwriter (born 1937)
- 1997 – Elspeth Huxley, Kenyan-English journalist and author (born 1907)
- 1997 – Sheldon Leonard, American actor, director, and producer (born 1907)
- 1997 – Alexander R. Todd, Baron Todd, Scottish biochemist and academic, Nobel Prize laureate (born 1907)
- 1999 – Edward Williams, Australian lieutenant, pilot, and judge (born 1921)
- 2000 – Sam Jaffe, American screenwriter and producer (born 1901)
- 2004 – Spalding Gray, American actor and screenwriter (born 1941)
- 2005 – Wasyly, Ukrainian-Canadian bishop (born 1909)
- 2005 – Jack Horner, American journalist (born 1912)
- 2005 – Princess Joséphine Charlotte of Belgium (born 1927)
- 2007 – Carlo Ponti, Italian film producer (born 1912)
- 2007 – Bradford Washburn, American explorer, photographer, and cartographer (born 1910)
- 2008 – Christopher Bowman, American figure skater and actor (born 1967)
- 2008 – Maila Nurmi, Finnish-American actress, producer, and screenwriter (born 1922)
- 2010 – Patcha Ramachandra Rao, Indian metallurgist, educator and administrator (born 1942)
- 2011 – María Elena Walsh, Argentine author and composer (born 1930)
- 2011 – Margaret Whiting, American singer (born 1924)
- 2012 – Jean Pigott, Canadian businesswoman and politician (born 1924)
- 2012 – Gevork Vartanian, Russian intelligence agent (born 1924)
- 2013 – George Gruntz, Swiss pianist and composer (born 1932)
- 2013 – Claude Nobs, Swiss businessman, founded the Montreux Jazz Festival (born 1936)
- 2014 – Sam Berns, American activist (born 1996)
- 2014 – Petr Hlaváček, Czech shoemaker and academic (born 1950)
- 2014 – Zbigniew Messner, Polish economist and politician, 9th Prime Minister of the Republic of Poland (born 1929)
- 2014 – Larry Speakes, American journalist, 16th White House Press Secretary (born 1939)
- 2014 – Dajikaka Gadgil, Indian jeweller (born 1915)
- 2015 – Junior Malanda, Belgian footballer (born 1994)
- 2015 – Taylor Negron, American actor, playwright, and painter (born 1957)
- 2015 – Francesco Rosi, Italian director and screenwriter (born 1922)
- 2015 – Robert Stone, American novelist and short story writer (born 1937)
- 2016 – David Bowie, English singer-songwriter, producer, and actor (born 1947)
- 2016 – Bård Breivik, Norwegian sculptor and art instructor (born 1948)
- 2016 – George Jonas, Hungarian-Canadian journalist, author, and poet (born 1935)
- 2017 – Buddy Greco, American jazz and pop singer and pianist (born 1926)
- 2017 – Clare Hollingworth, English journalist (born 1911)
- 2019 – Ross Lowell, American inventor, photographer & author (born 1926)
- 2020 – Qaboos bin Said, ruler of Oman (born 1940)
- 2022 – Joyce Eliason, American television personality (born 1934)
- 2022 – Robert Durst, American real estate heir and convicted murderer (born 1943)
- 2023 – Jeff Beck, English guitarist and songwriter (born 1944)
- 2023 – Constantine II of Greece, King of Greece (1964-1973) (born 1940)
- 2025 – José Jiménez, Puerto Rican activist (born 1948)
- 2025 – Bill McCartney, American football player and coach (born 1940)
- 2025 – Sam Moore, American soul singer-songwriter (born 1935)
- 2026 – Yeison Jiménez, Colombian singer, (born 1991)
- 2026 – Bob Weir, American musician, (born 1947)

== Holidays and observances ==
- Christian feast day:
  - Behnam, Sarah, and the Forty Martyrs (Armenian Apostolic Church)
  - Gregory of Nyssa
  - Leonie Aviat
  - Obadiah (Coptic Church)
  - Peter Orseolo
  - Pope Agatho (Roman Catholic)
  - William Laud (Anglican Communion)
  - William of Donjeon
  - January 10 (Eastern Orthodox liturgics)
- Fête du Vodoun (Benin)
- Margaret Thatcher Day (Falkland Islands)
- Majority Rule Day (Bahamas)
