= The Indian Institute of World Culture =

Indian Institute of World Culture
- Type: Public Library, Cultural Center, Center for Promotion of Global Understanding
- Established: August, 1945, by B.P. Wadia
- Location: Bangalore, Karnataka, India
- Website: https://iiwc.in/

The Indian Institute of World Culture (IIWC), is a public institution that aims, via its activities, "to foster the growth of a truly cosmopolitan spirit among citizens of all nations." It is located on B.P Wadia Road in the Basavanagudi area of the city of Bengaluru, India, and was founded on 11 August 1945 by B. P. Wadia and his spouse, Sophia Wadia.

== Description ==
It houses a general library of over 40,000 books, a children's library and, a magazine section that subscribes to over 400 well regarded periodicals from around the world. The IIWC organizes well over a hundred public events each year that comprise lectures and cultural performances and these are free and open to the public. Recordings of live events held at the IIWC are available online at the IIWC website. The general library is known to have many rare and old books, in its collections, and is particularly sought after by those interested in philosophy, history, literature, the social sciences, travel writing, writing on the arts and music, the natural world and poetry, besides fiction. The book collection is largely in English, but also includes a selection of Kannada titles. The children's library contains several thousand books from around the world, both fiction and non-fiction, for young readers, including illustrated volumes and reference books.

Memberships are nominally priced, and individuals intending to be members must sign a declaration that says, "I declare my sympathy with the ideal of Universal Brotherhood and will endeavor to cultivate the attitude of brotherliness in my daily living." Besides its calendar of programs, the IIWC also offers ongoing art and bhajan classes as well as special summer programs (typically in the months of April and May, each year) covering a variety of interest areas including art, craft, cooking, music, puppetry, gardening and so on. The IIWC has endeared itself over the decades, since its founding, to citizens of the city, and has come to serve many, as a window to a world of literature, arts, philosophy, sciences, new thought and culture. The IIWC often finds itself mentioned in lists of notable organizations in the city. It has attracted, to its lecture platform, eminent personalities including C P Ramaswamy Ayiar, Julian Huxley, Arnold Toynbee, C Rajagopalachari, John Boyd Orr, The Panchen Lama, Jayant Vishnu Narlikar, K G Saiyidin, Karan Singh, Martin Luther King Jr., Salman Rushdie and many others. The IIWC is closely associated, in its founding principles, with the United Lodge of Theosophists (ULT) and historically, with the ULT's Bengaluru lodge.
