= Sophia Wadia =

Columbian-born Indian theosophist and writer (1901–1986)

Padma Shri Sophia Wadia
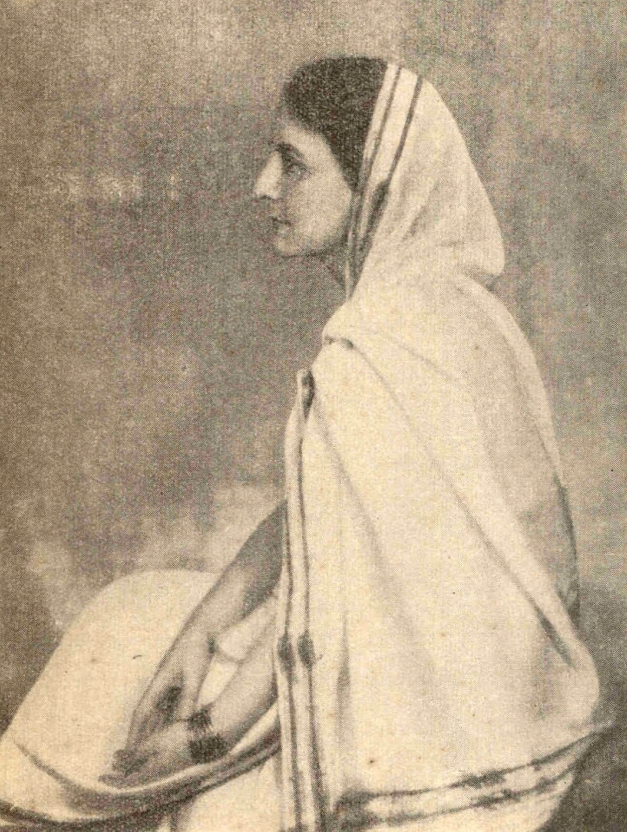
- Born: 1901; Colombia
- Died: 27 April 1986 (aged 84–85); India
- Other name: Sophia Camacho
- Citizenship: Colombia (former); India
- Occupations: Theosophist, literateur
- Spouse: B. P. Wadia
- Awards: Padma Shri

Sophia Wadia, née Camacho, was a Colombian-born Indian theosophist, littérateur, the founder of PEN All India Centre and the founder editor of its journal, The Indian PEN. She also cofounded The Indian Institute of World Culture, Bangalore (now Bengaluru) and the Asian Book Trust, Bombay (now Mumbai). The Government of India honoured Wadia in 1960, with the award of Padma Shri, the fourth highest Indian civilian award, for her services to the nation.

== Biography ==
Sophia Camacho was born in 1901 in Colombia and did her education in her motherland, Paris, London and New York. In 1927, she met B. P. Wadia, an Indian theosophist on tour to European countries, was influenced by his philosophy and married him in 1928. The next year, she went to India with her spouse and got involved in his activities. The Wadias founded several branches of the United Lodge of Theosophists in various places in Europe and founded the first Indian branch in Mumbai in 1929.

The couple founded the All India Centre of the International P.E.N. in Mumbai in 1930 and launched two journals, The India PEN and The Aryan Path. Sophia was the editor of The India Pen and remained in that position till her death. In 1945, she established The Indian Institute of World Culture in 1945 at Basavanagudi, near Bengaluru in the South Indian state of Karnataka. During this period, she published two books, The Brotherhood of Religions in 1936 and Preparation for Citizenship in 1941, the latter with foreword by Nobel Laureate, Rabindranath Tagore. The second edition of The Brotherhood of Religions came out in 1944 with foreword written by Mahatma Gandhi. She was also instrumental in the establishment of Asian Book Trust in Mumbai which later published her husband's renowned work, The Gandhian Way.

Sophia Wadia continued her social life after her husband's death in 1958 and organized eleven All India Writers' Conferences. The Government of India awarded her the civilian honour of Padma Shri in 1960.

== Global policy ==
She was one of the signatories of the agreement to convene a convention for drafting a world constitution. As a result, for the first time in human history, a World Constituent Assembly convened to draft and adopt the Constitution for the Federation of Earth.

== Death ==
She died on 27 April 1986, at the age of 85.

== See also ==
- United Lodge of Theosophists
- The Indian Institute of World Culture
- PEN International
- Theosophism
