= Leo Steiner =

American businessman

Leo Steiner (c. 1939 – December 31, 1987) was an American restaurateur who was co-owner of the Carnegie Deli, located next to Carnegie Hall at 55th Street and Seventh Avenue in the New York City borough of Manhattan. While his partner, Milton Parker, mostly worked behind the scenes, Steiner worked the crowd with his Jewish humor in the restaurant, which became a destination for both celebrities and tourists in the theater district.

Steiner was born in Newark, New Jersey. He worked in his parents' grocery store in nearby Elizabeth, New Jersey, where he grew up. The one-time owner of Pastrami & Things, a delicatessen located at Third Avenue and 23rd Street, he joined Milton Parker and Fred Klein in 1976, purchasing the Carnegie Deli from the trio of Bernie Gross, Max Hudas and Thomas North. Klein, who had not been actively involved in running the business, dropped out shortly thereafter.

Under the management of Parker and Steiner, the deli became known nationwide, attracting celebrities such as Woody Allen, Jackie Mason and Henny Youngman, and opened branch locations in Atlantic City, New Jersey, Secaucus, New Jersey and Tysons Corner, Virginia.

Steiner became the public face of Jewish food, appearing in a television commercial for rye bread. He created a 60-pound Statue of Liverty carved from chopped liver, complete with a torch fashioned from a turkey wing, for the United States Bicentennial and was asked to prepare corned beef and pastrami for visiting heads of state attending the G7 economic summit meeting held in 1983 in Williamsburg, Virginia. Portions of Woody Allen's 1984 film Broadway Danny Rose were filmed at the restaurant.

The deli's corned beef and pastrami, celebrated by smoked meat connoisseurs nationwide, were cured in the store's cellar using Steiner's own recipe in a two-week-long curing process. The Carnegie Deli used a half-ton of brisket to prepare a week's supply of corned beef by the time of his death. Steiner admitted that "you could eat it after seven days, but if you wait until the 13th you're in heaven".

A resident of Manhattan, Steiner died at age 48 on December 31, 1987, at Columbia-Presbyterian Medical Center due to complications of a brain tumor and was buried at Gomel Chesed Cemetery in Elizabeth, New Jersey. He was survived by his wife Irma and two brothers, Sam, a manager at the Carnegie Deli at the time of Leo's death, and Robert, a stockbroker in Lakewood, NJ.

Steiner was eulogized by comedian Henny Youngman as "the deli lama". Many felt that the Carnegie Deli had deteriorated, even just several months after Steiner's death. Corbett Monica, a comedian featured in scenes of Broadway Danny Rose filmed at the restaurant, lamented that "It's not the same kind of warm haimish feeling since Leo passed away." Mark Simone, a radio personality at WNEW-FM reminisced that "The Carnegie used to be a party every afternoon, and the reason was Leo Steiner... You could go there any afternoon and sit with celebrities. Now it's just not happening. And a lot of those people are coming to the Stage." Even Steiner's wife, who was then involved in a protracted battle with her husband's former partner over the valuation of the business, had abandoned the Carnegie, stating that "Since Leo died, I don't feel right about going to the Carnegie."
