= The Theosophical Movement =

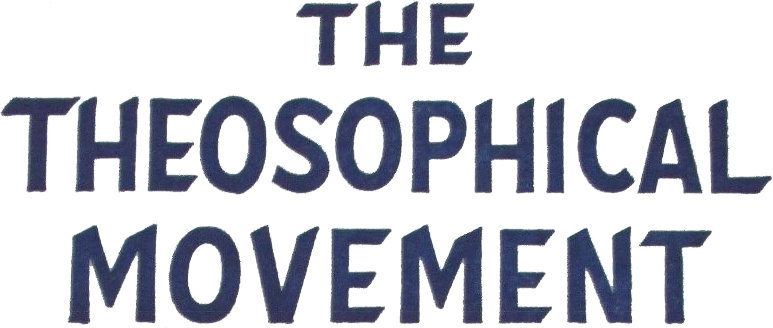
Front cover of The Theosophical Movement magazine

The Theosophical Movement is a monthly magazine that was started by the United Lodge of Theosophists India under B.P. Wadia on 17 November 1912. It is a magazine that is devoted to the living of the higher life. The monthly magazine is edited in Mumbai, India, by associates of the ULT. Its print and electronic editions have subscribers all over the world. All articles in the magazine are unsigned, except those that had been written by H.P.B., W.Q.J. or others who had made signed contributions in the older Theosophical magazines. Furthermore, articles in the magazine distinctly avoid all references to personal opinions and experiences of the author. These are directly in keeping with one of the core tenets of anonymity and impersonality of ULT associates as expressed by Robert Crosbie. The magazine is dedicated to:

1. the furthering the objects of the Theosophical Movement,
2. disseminate fundamental ideas of the philosophy of Theosophy, and
3. aid students in the understanding of the philosophy and its application to daily life.
