= Milton Parker =

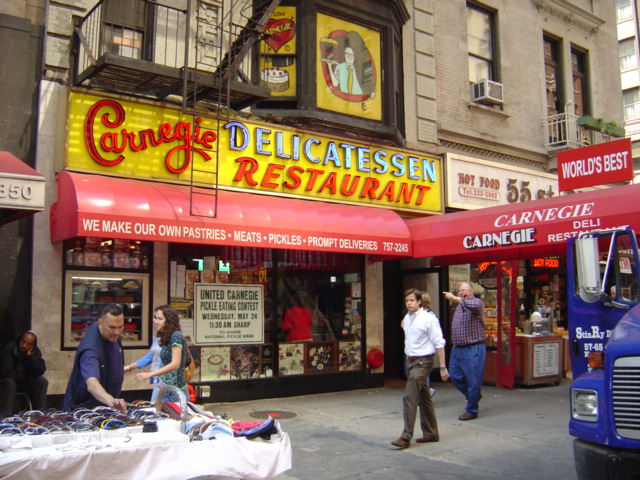
The Carnegie Deli.

Milton Parker (January 10, 1919 – January 30, 2009) was a co-owner of the Carnegie Deli, located at 55th Street and Seventh Avenue next to Carnegie Hall in the New York City borough of Manhattan, serving as the behind-the-scenes preparer of towering pastrami sandwiches while his partner Leo Steiner was the tummler who entertained celebrities, locals and tourists.

Parker was born on January 10, 1919, in Williamsburg, Brooklyn, to Jacob and Jennie Picker Packowitz, both of whom died while Parker was a child. He worked in Brooklyn diners and luncheonettes as a teen, and opened a coffee shop in a mall near Levittown, New York. He sold the establishment in the 1970s, but was bored after spending a year in retirement. Hearing from a business broker who knew that the Carnegie Deli was up for sale, he was part of a group that bought the business.

The Carnegie Deli was taken over by Parker in 1976, together with Leo Steiner and a third, less-active partner who sold his stake in the restaurant. Steiner died in 1987, and Parker retired in 2002, with management taken over by Sanford Levine, his son-in-law. Parker's business cards described him as "Milton Parker, CPM (Certified Pastrami Maven)".

Parker worked in the kitchen, behind the scenes, responsible for the traditional Eastern European Jewish cuisine of smoked meats — corned beef, pastrami, brisket and tongue — loaded into 5-inch-high (130 mm) sandwiches, along with chicken soup and matzah balls, pickles and cheesecake. Partner Leo Steiner was the master of ceremonies in the dining room, greeting the many celebrities, such as Woody Allen, Jackie Mason, Yves Montand and Henny Youngman and taking them to their tables of choice and entertaining the many theater district tourists who came to partake in the festivities.

Of the many delicatessens in the area, the Carnegie Deli has had a longstanding rivalry with the nearby Stage Deli. While the Stage Delicatessen long had the better reputation, a 1979 article in The New York Times that rated the Carnegie Deli's pastrami as superior helped spur business and set off what had been described as the "Pastrami War". While both businesses routinely had customers lined up outside the door, Parker dismissed the Stage Deli, saying that "They're living off our overflow". Among the allegations in the war was that the Carnegie Deli's pastrami was made at its commissary in Secaucus, New Jersey, with water from the Garden State, unlike the New York City water used to prepare the brine made by the Stage Deli for its pastrami.

Scenes from Woody Allen's 1984 film Broadway Danny Rose, which told the story of a hapless talent agent, played by Allen, had much of the movie featuring scenes filmed over a meal at the Carnegie Deli.

Though the restaurant had opened in 1938, it never had knishes on the menu until 1988, when they were introduced by Parker, accompanied by a knish-eating competition created as a publicity stunt. The $250 prize went to a soda salesman from Brooklyn who had never eaten a knish before, but managed to consume four and one-half of the one-pound knishes in the allotted 15 minutes.

A Los Angeles branch of the Carnegie Deli, co-owned by billionaire Marvin Davis, opened with much fanfare in July 1989, with opening ceremonies including Carol Channing dropping a giant Styrofoam matzoh ball into a correspondingly huge bowl of chicken soup, with the ceremonial slicing of a 6-foot-long (1.8 m) salami substituting for the more traditional ribbon cutting. In the face of declining business and poor reviews, including what was called by Zagat Survey's local restaurant guide as the city's "worst chicken soup", the restaurant closed down in November 1994.

Catskills Mountains comedian Freddie Roman lamented his death, reminiscing that "In the history of delicatessens, Milton Parker's Carnegie Deli caused more heartburn to the Jewish world than anything I've ever heard of" and that "His pastrami sandwich was incredibly much too large for human consumption."

A resident of Manhattan, Parker died at age 90 on January 30, 2009, due to respiratory problems. He was survived by his wife of 62 years, the former Mildred Levy, a son, a daughter, a brother and a granddaughter.
