= The Aryan Path =

Anglo-Indian theosophical journal

The Aryan Path was an Anglo-Indian theosophical journal published in Bombay, India, between 1930 and 1979. An article in the Theosophical Movement Magazine, also edited by B. P. Wadia at the time, described Aryan Path in the following terms:

Wherever thought has struggled to be free, wherever spiritual ideas, as opposed to forms and dogmatism, have been promulgated, there the great Movement is to be discerned. This aspect can rightly be named the Republic of Conscience; for, wherever human conscience is active, in honesty and sincerity, there the potency of Theosophy is present. The Aryan Path is the vehicle of this aspect of the Theosophical Movement, while it also presents teachings of practical value to the aspirant for the Higher Life and to the students of the esoteric science.

Its mission was threefold:

1. To penetrate the mind of the race with Theosophical ideas and principles of the Esoteric Philosophy.
2. To present teachings about the Aryan or Noble Path which can be practised.
3. To bring to the Westerner the Light of the East, and to present to the Oriental whatever there is — and there is a great deal — of beauty and worth in Occidental culture; at the same time to attempt to spiritualize the mind and to deepen the insight of many kinds of Free Thinkers, among whom are students of Theosophy with different affiliations.

The magazine's first editor was B. P. Wadia. It was published on a bimonthly basis by a group called the Theosophy Company, which distributed copies of the magazine to London.

== History and profile ==
The Aryan Path was founded in January 1930. In its first edition, a writer named "Shravaka" emphasised that

so much "original" writing is done today, so much "self-expression" is indulged in that, in the glamour that is raised, the chants of the Gods remain unheard. One of our tasks is to bring home the truth that it is not derogatory to respect the old age facts of the science of the soul.

The Aryan Path was published in English on a monthly basis. The journal contained a variety of articles on Hindu and Buddhist spiritual traditions, as well as essays on English literature, Ruskinian socialism, aesthetics and science. The journal's contributors included C. E. M. Joad, John Middleton Murry, A. E. Waite, Ramananda Chatterjee, Edmond Holmes, Max Plowman, J. D. Beresford, Hugh I'Anson Fausset, Hugh de Sélincourt, Humbert Wolfe and Gertrude Emerson Sen. The March 1930 issue carried an essay on reincarnation by Algernon Blackwood.

The March 1932 issue carried the article "Goethe and the East" by Otto Schrader, described by The Spectator magazine as "timely and interesting".

Black American scholars such as Alain Locke and William Harrison also contributed to this journal. The magazine ran several articles criticising racism.

After 1933 the magazine received considerable correspondence concerning the rise of Nazism, which the journal strongly opposed. In 1938 The Aryan Path ran an article condemning fascism and Nazism by G. D. H. Cole.

In 1952 The Aryan Path ran a series of articles on the Bon religion of Tibet by René de Nebesky-Wojkowitz.

The articles of this journal have been quoted in discussions about race relations, Indian civilization and English literature.

The Aryan Path ceased publication in 1979.
