= Carnegie Deli =

American delicatessen chain

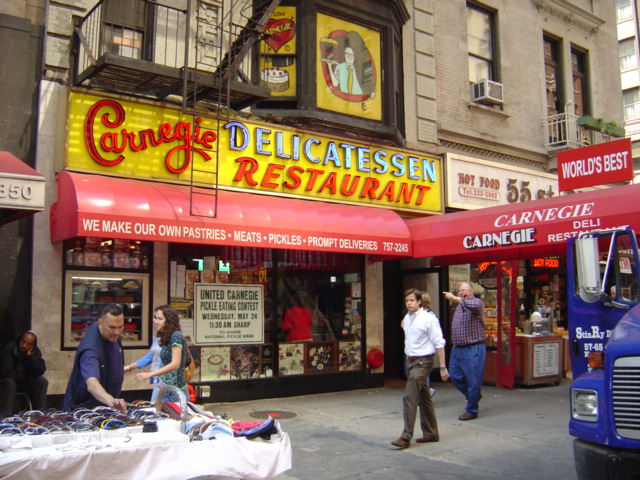
- Carnegie Deli in Midtown Manhattan (2006)
- Interactive map of Carnegie Deli

Restaurant information
- Established: 1937 (original location) September 15, 2026 (current location)
- Closed: December 31, 2016 (original location)
- Food type: Jewish delicatessen
- Dress code: Casual
- Location: 834 7th Avenue, Manhattan, New York City, New York, 10019, United States
- Reservations: Walk-in only
- Website: www.carnegiedeli.com

The Carnegie Deli is a Jewish delicatessen, formerly a chain, based in New York City. Its main branch, opened in 1937 near Carnegie Hall, was located at 854 7th Avenue (between 54th and 55th Streets) in Midtown Manhattan. It officially closed on December 31, 2016, but on September 15, 2026, Carnegie Deli opened a new flagship location at the site of the former Stage Deli. There is also one branch that has been in continuous operation at Madison Square Garden in Manhattan, and the deli continued to operate a wholesale distribution service after the original closure. (Note: "We appreciate all your heartfelt wishes and your love of the Carnegie Deli. After December 30, 2016, you can continue to purchase Carnegie Deli's signature products online or visit the Carnegie Deli's licensed locations (Madison Square Garden, Carnegie Deli Las Vegas at the Mirage Hotel & Casino, Carnegie Deli at the Sands Casino Resort in Bethlehem, PA and annually at the U.S. Open in Flushing Meadows, Queens). The family is not affiliated with any fundraising efforts to continue operations and caution patrons with any efforts to do so.")

The Parker family's delicatessen was in its third generation of owners. Among the United States' most renowned delis, it was operated by a second-generation owner, Marian Harper Levine.

The restaurant offers pastrami, corned beef, and other sandwiches containing at least one pound (450 g) of meat, as well as traditional Jewish fare such as matzoh ball soup, latkes, chopped chicken livers, and lox. The restaurant also offered other, non-Jewish food such as ham, sausage, and bacon. Available for order were cheesecake portions of over one per serving. The restaurant's motto was: "If you can finish your meal, we've done something wrong." In addition to the large servings, the restaurant was also known for its surly waiters, who allegedly tried to impart some of the stereotypical gruffness of New York to visitors.

== History ==
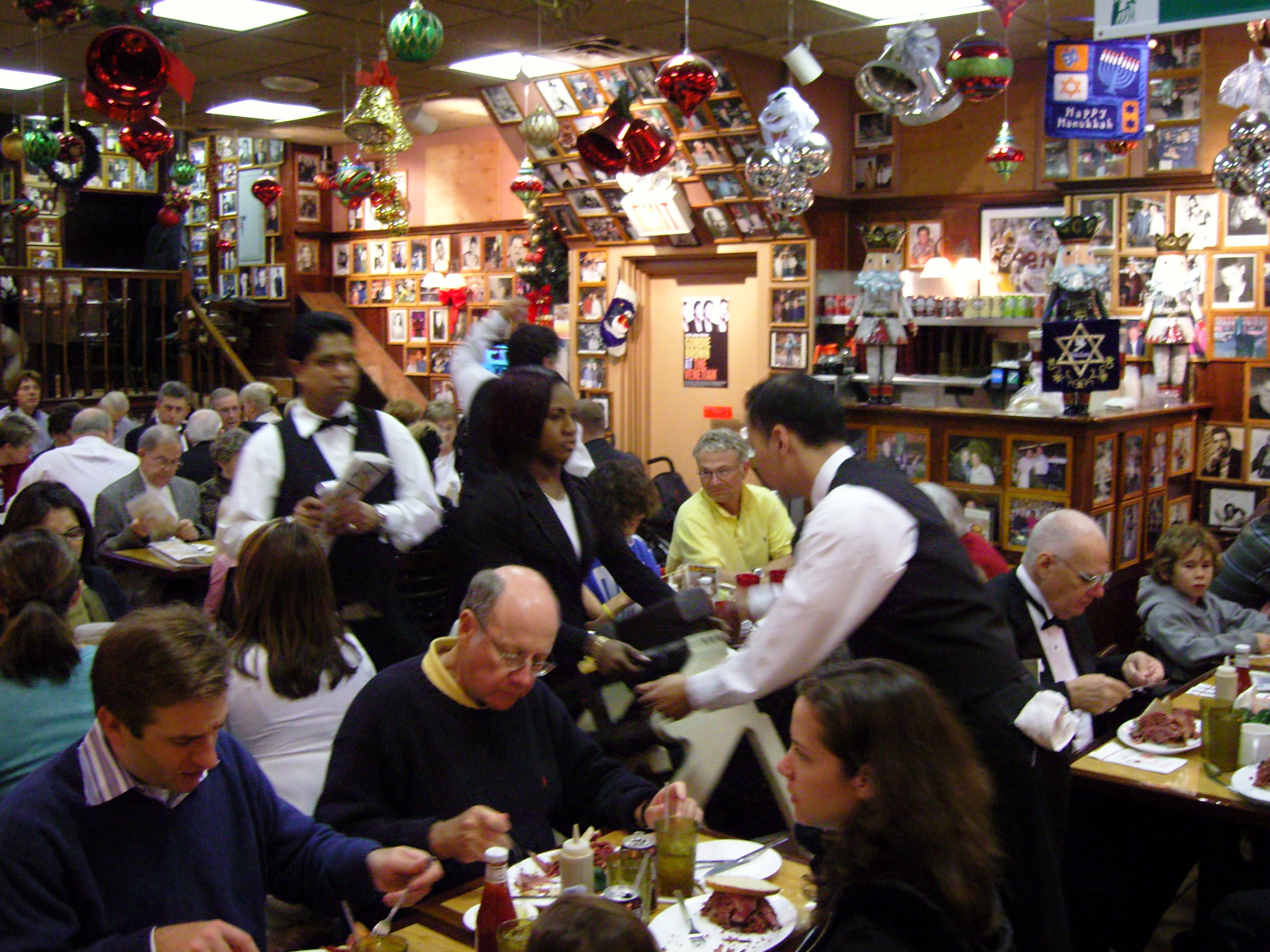
Inside the Carnegie Deli in 2006

=== Early history ===
Leo Steiner (c. 1939 – December 31, 1987) was a Jewish American restaurateur who was co-owner of the first Carnegie Deli, located at 55th Street and Seventh Avenue in Midtown Manhattan near Carnegie Hall. While his partner, Milton Parker, mostly worked behind the scenes, Steiner worked the crowd with his Jewish humor in the restaurant, which became a destination for both celebrities and tourists in the theater district. Steiner was born in Newark, New Jersey. He worked in his parents' grocery store in nearby Elizabeth, New Jersey, where he grew up. The one-time owner of Pastrami & Things, a delicatessen located at Third Avenue and 23rd Street, he joined Milton Parker and Fred Klein in 1976, purchasing the Carnegie Deli from the trio of Bernie Gross, Max Hudas and Thomas North. Klein, who had not been actively involved in running the business, dropped out shortly thereafter.

Under the management of Parker and Steiner, the deli became known nationwide, attracting celebrities such as Woody Allen, Jackie Mason and Henny Youngman, and opened branch locations in Atlantic City, New Jersey; Secaucus, New Jersey; and Tysons Corner, Virginia. Steiner became the public face of Jewish food, appearing in a television commercial for rye bread. He created a 60-pound (27 kg) Statue of Liberty carved from chopped liver, complete with a torch fashioned from a turkey wing, for the United States Bicentennial and was asked to prepare corned beef and pastrami for visiting heads of state attending the G7 economic summit meeting held in 1983 in Williamsburg, Virginia. Portions of Woody Allen's 1984 movie Broadway Danny Rose were filmed in the restaurant.

Milton Parker, who died in 2009, had written a book (with Allyn Freeman) called How to Feed Friends and Influence People: The Carnegie Deli, providing the history of the family's ownership.

=== Main branch closures, pop-up location, and reopening ===
On April 24, 2015, the main Midtown Manhattan branch of Carnegie Deli was closed temporarily due to the discovery of an illegal gas line in the restaurant. Con Edison was investigating the incident, later fining the eatery $40,050. On July 28, 2015, Carnegie Deli was subsequently closed for upgrades to its gas lines. The deli reopened on February 9, 2016.

On September 30, 2016, it was announced that the Midtown Manhattan branch of the deli would close by the end of the year. The owner, Marian Harper Levine, stated that she needed a more permanent break from operating the restaurant, saying, "At this stage of my life, the early morning to late night days have taken a toll, along with my sleepless nights and grueling hours that come with operating a restaurant business in Manhattan." Two branches in Las Vegas, Nevada, and Bethlehem, Pennsylvania, remained open, as well as the wholesale distribution service.

At midnight on December 31, 2016, Carnegie Deli on Seventh Avenue closed after almost eighty years of service.

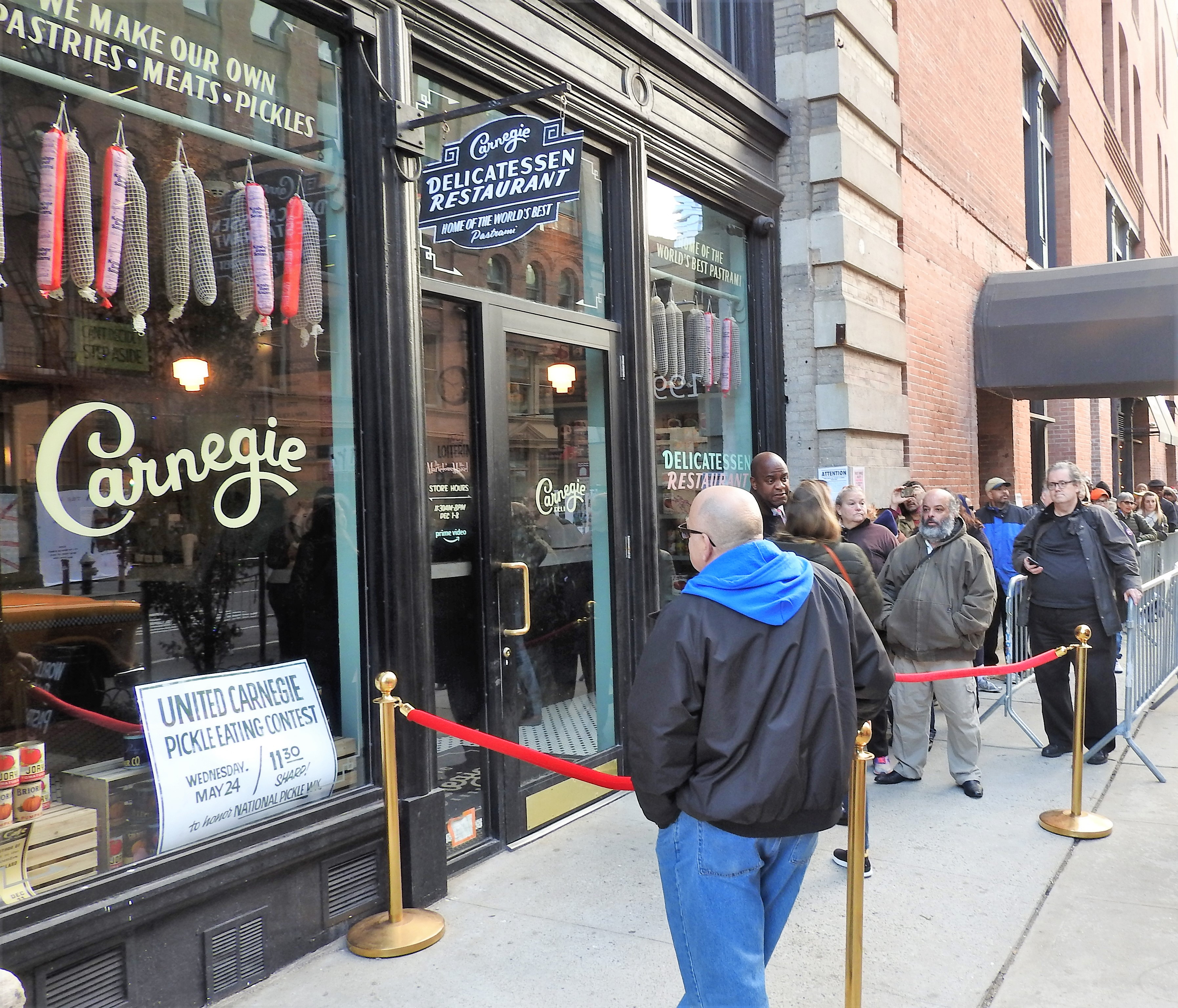
Pop-up promotional restaurant on Lafayette Street

This is Carnegie Diner at 57th Street, not Carnegie Deli, a separate company

In 2011, Carnegie Deli had opened a storefront within Madison Square Garden. After the closing of the Seventh Avenue location in 2016, this location became the last physical Carnegie Deli location in New York, until it reopened in 2026.

The Bethlehem location closed at the end of 2017. For one week in December 2018, Amazon Prime worked with the owners of the Carnegie Deli and Eddie Fahmy from A2z Restaurant Consulting, a New York based consulting firm to bring the restaurant back to life on Lafayette Street in the Nolita section of Manhattan as a pop-up restaurant in celebration of the second season of The Marvelous Mrs. Maisel. There were more than 6,000 reservations taken to dine-in with servers in period attire. Food was offered at 1958 prices and all purchases were made as suggested donations to charity. In May 2019, Amazon Prime with A2Z brought Carnegie Deli back again, this time as a food truck which traveled around Manhattan for three days giving out sandwiches and cookies for free in order to help promote The Marvelous Mrs. Maisel. The Las Vegas location closed in 2020.

On September 15, 2026, the Carnegie Deli reopened at 834 7th Avenue and 54th Street, nearby its original location and where the Stage Deli used to be.

== Cuisine and culture ==
The deli's corned beef and pastrami, celebrated by smoked meat connoisseurs nationwide, were cured in the store's cellar using Steiner's own recipe in a two-week-long curing process. The Carnegie Deli used a half-ton of brisket to prepare a week's supply of corned beef by the time of his death. Steiner admitted, "You could eat it after seven days, but if you wait until the 13th you're in heaven." The Carnegie Deli was the favorite hangout of comedian Henny Youngman, and Adam Sandler included a reference to the deli in "The Chanukah Song" in 1996. Steiner was eulogized by Youngman as "the deli lama."

The walls of the deli were nearly completely covered with autographed pictures of celebrities who had eaten there. Menu items were named after famous patrons, including a corned beef and pastrami sandwich named after Woody Allen after the deli served as a filming location for Broadway Danny Rose. A number of items on the menu featured Broadway themes and Yiddish vocabulary, including such dishes as "nosh, nosh, Nanette" (after the musical "No, No, Nanette") and "the egg and oy" ("The Egg and I"). There were also some humorous items in the menu, such as the famous liver sandwich named "50 Ways to Love Your Liver" after the Paul Simon song "50 Ways to Leave Your Lover." It was a place frequented by many reporters in the city, including staffers from Black Rock (aka the CBS Building) such as Bob Simon.

In March 2012, the deli introduced a sandwich dedicated to newly arrived New York Jets quarterback Tim Tebow. The sandwich, named the "Jetbow", was priced at $22.22, weighed in at 3.5 lbs and consisted of corned beef, pastrami, roast beef, American cheese, lettuce and tomato on white bread.

In 2021, Carnegie Deli announced a collaboration with comedian Mel Brooks, in which the deli offered specialty foods to complement Brooks' memoir, All About Me!

== Branch locations ==
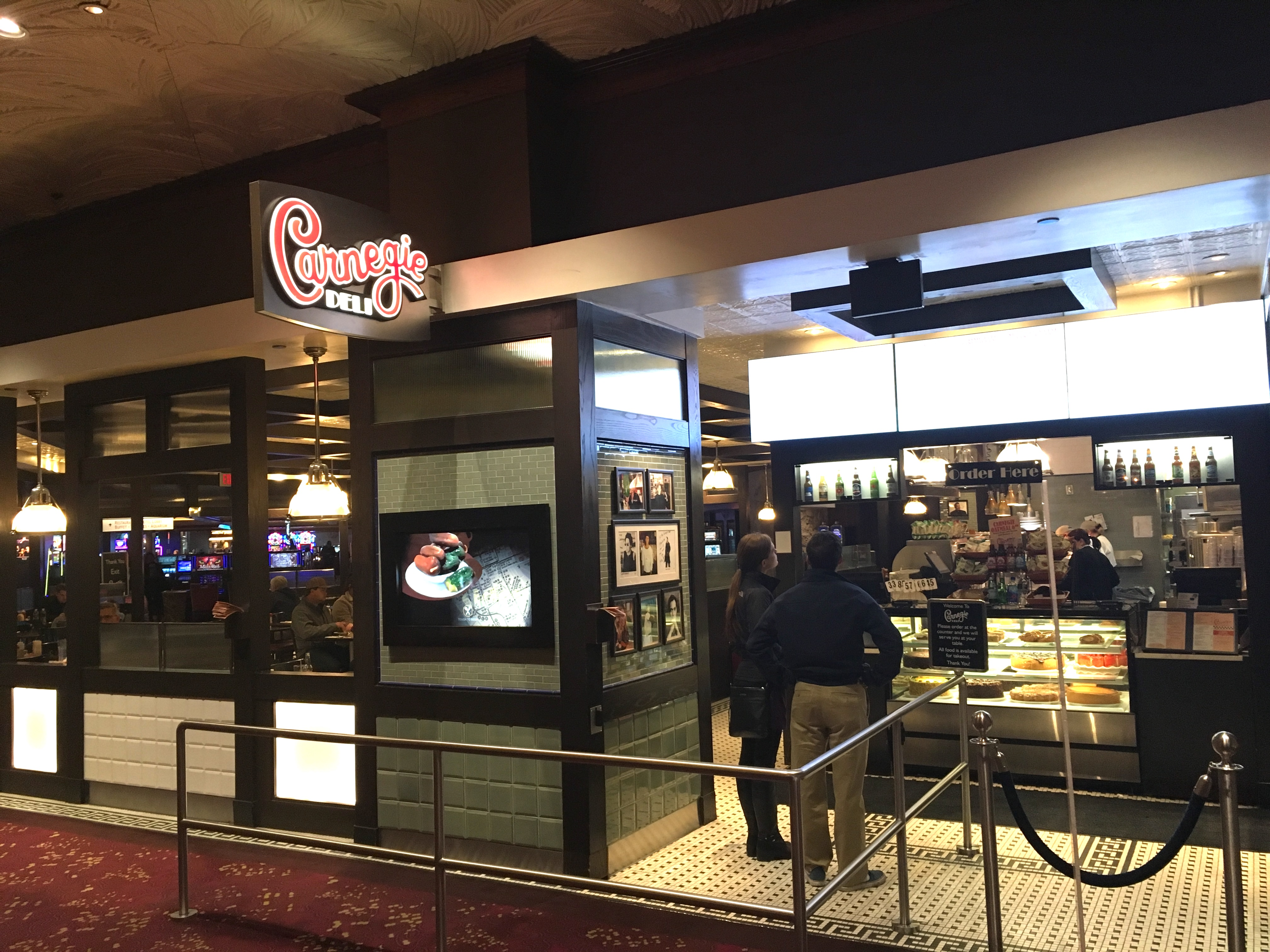
One of the deli's prior branch locations, at the Mirage on the Las Vegas Strip

The deli opened several branch locations in the 1980s, including two New Jersey branches in Secaucus and Atlantic City and one in the Washington, D.C. suburbs in Tysons Corner. However, most of these branches have since closed and are no longer in operation. One, in Beverly Hills, California, was financed by oil billionaire Marvin Davis and designed by restaurant designer Pat Kuleto at a cost of $4 million to be the "best deli in the world", in response to Davis' complaint that the delis in California were not as good as those in New York.

The deli operated a second location on the Las Vegas Strip, which opened at the Mirage in 2005. The Las Vegas location closed a few weeks prior to February 9, 2020. A third location opened in 2006 at the Six Flags Great Adventure in New Jersey and served as the "healthy choice" restaurant at the park; however, the menu was smaller and only had the restaurant's most popular items. The fifth location was at the Sands Casino Resort in Bethlehem, Pennsylvania. It opened on November 22, 2009, and closed at the end of 2017.

In addition to the retail operation, the restaurant sells cheesecakes and merchandise such as T-shirts and baseball caps online.

== Critical reception ==
In March 1979, Mimi Sheraton penned a New York Times newspaper review that rated Carnegie Deli the "Tops" in pastrami and corned beef preparation and taste. Sheraton wrote "The generous sandwiches of both corned beef and pastrami are simply wonderful."

In 2013, Zagat gave it a food rating of 23, and rated it the 8th-best deli in New York City.

In 2012 USA Today called the restaurant the "most famous" deli in the United States.

== Gallery ==
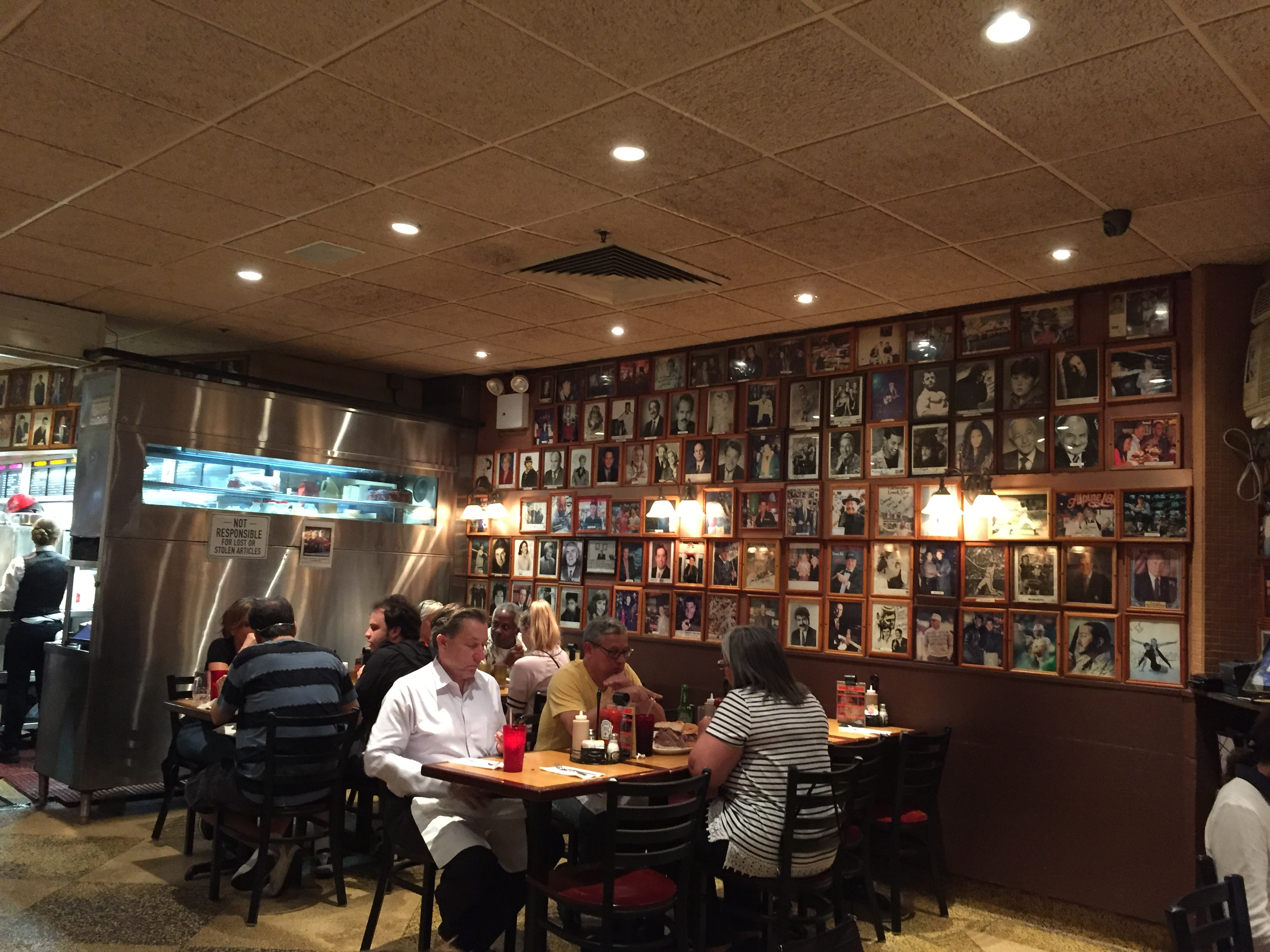
Interior of 7th Avenue restaurant

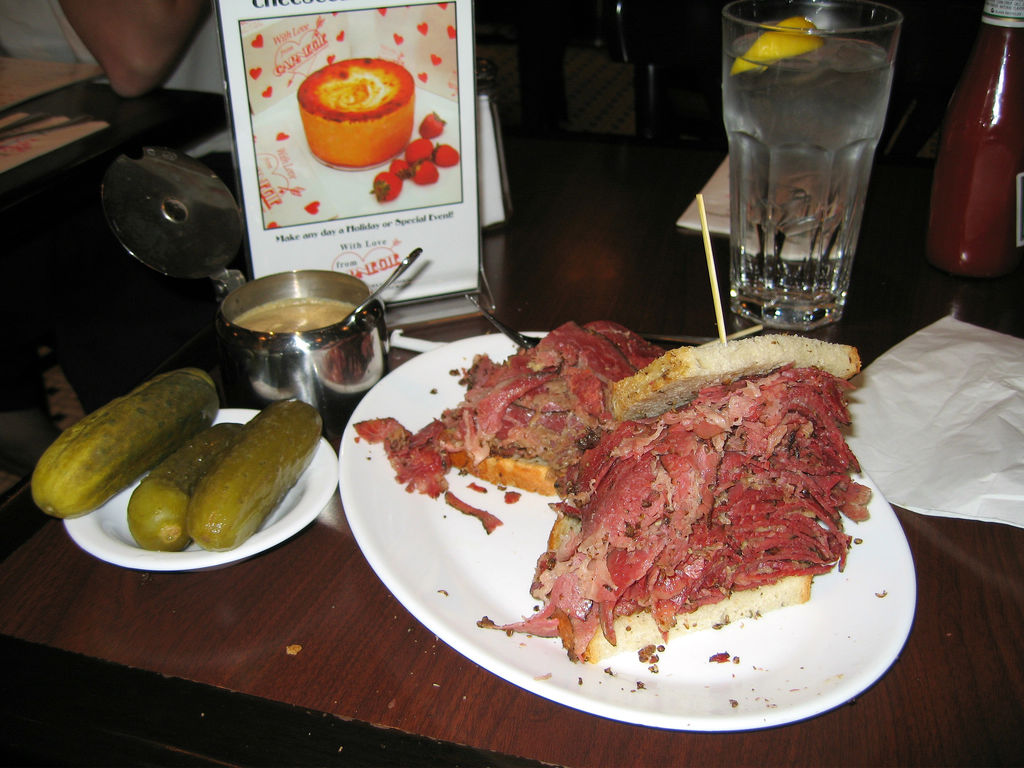
A pastrami sandwich

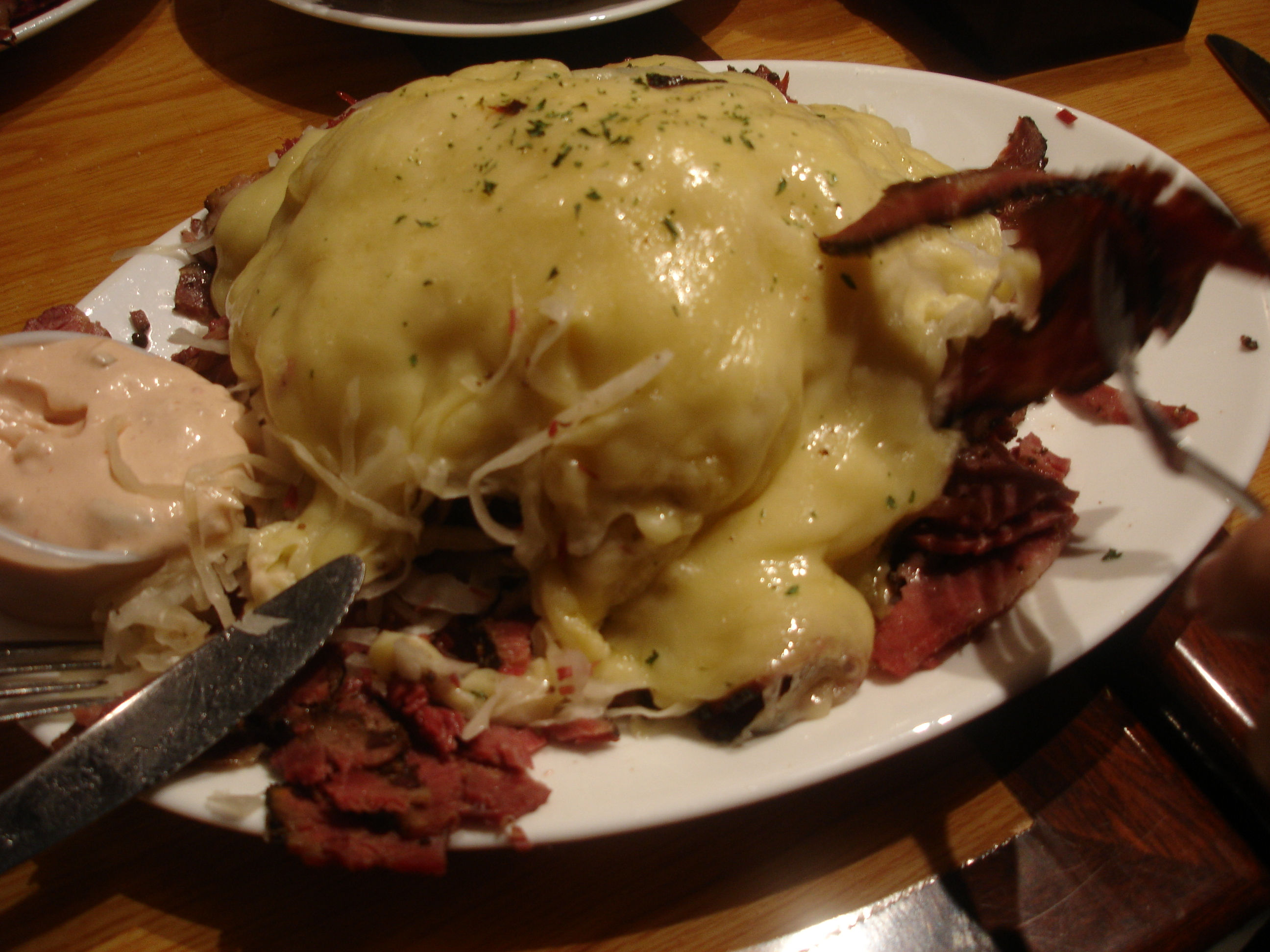
A Reuben sandwich

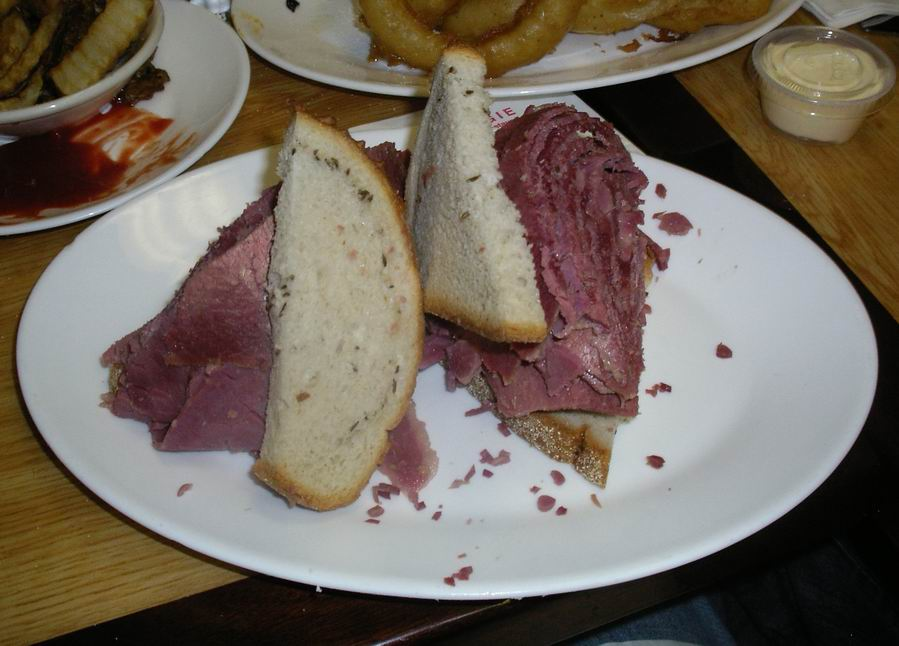
A corned beef sandwich

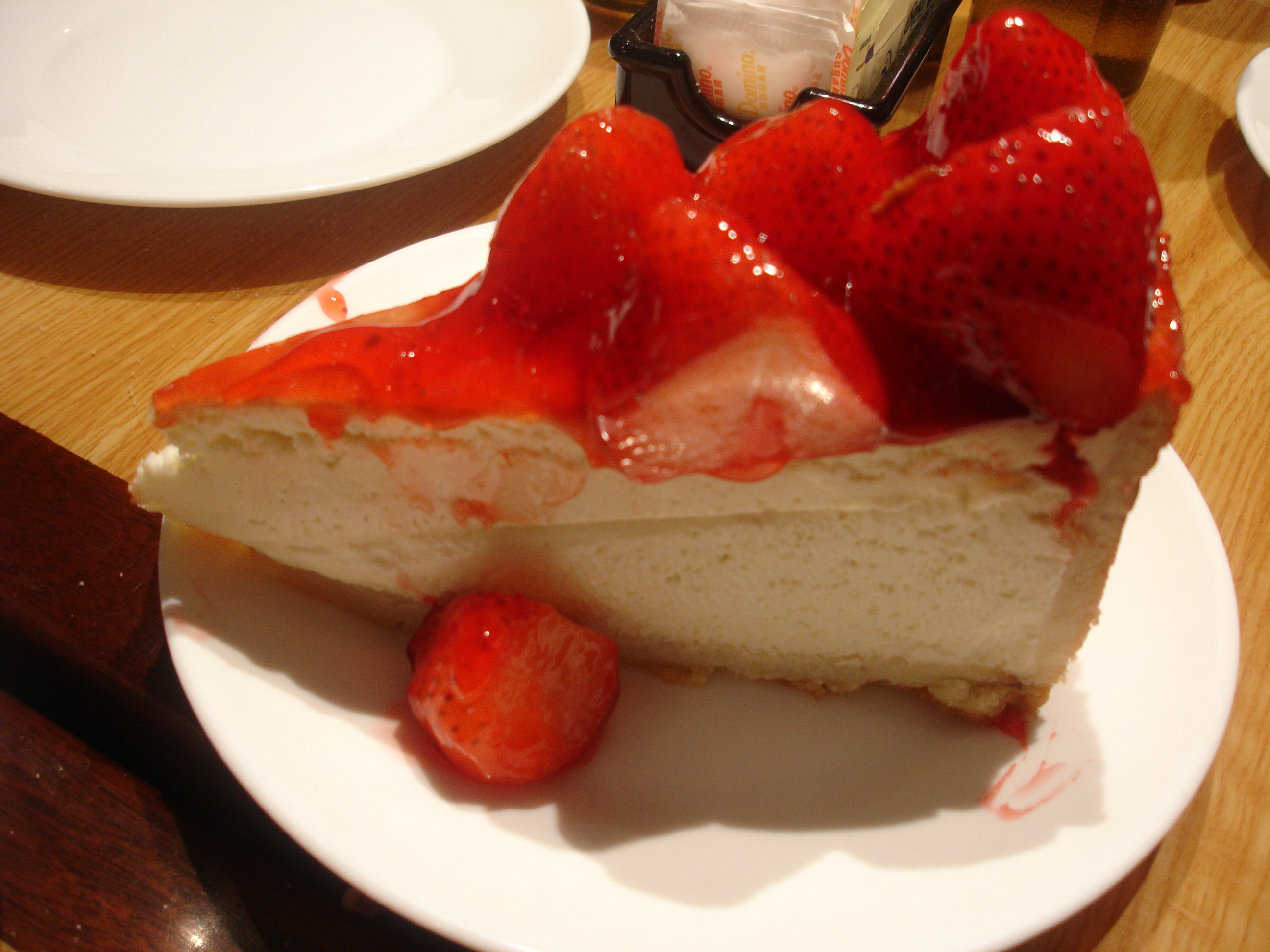
A slice of strawberry cheesecake

== See also ==
- List of Ashkenazi Jewish restaurants
- List of delicatessens
