= Silvia Kumpan-Takacs =

Austrian politician (born 1979)

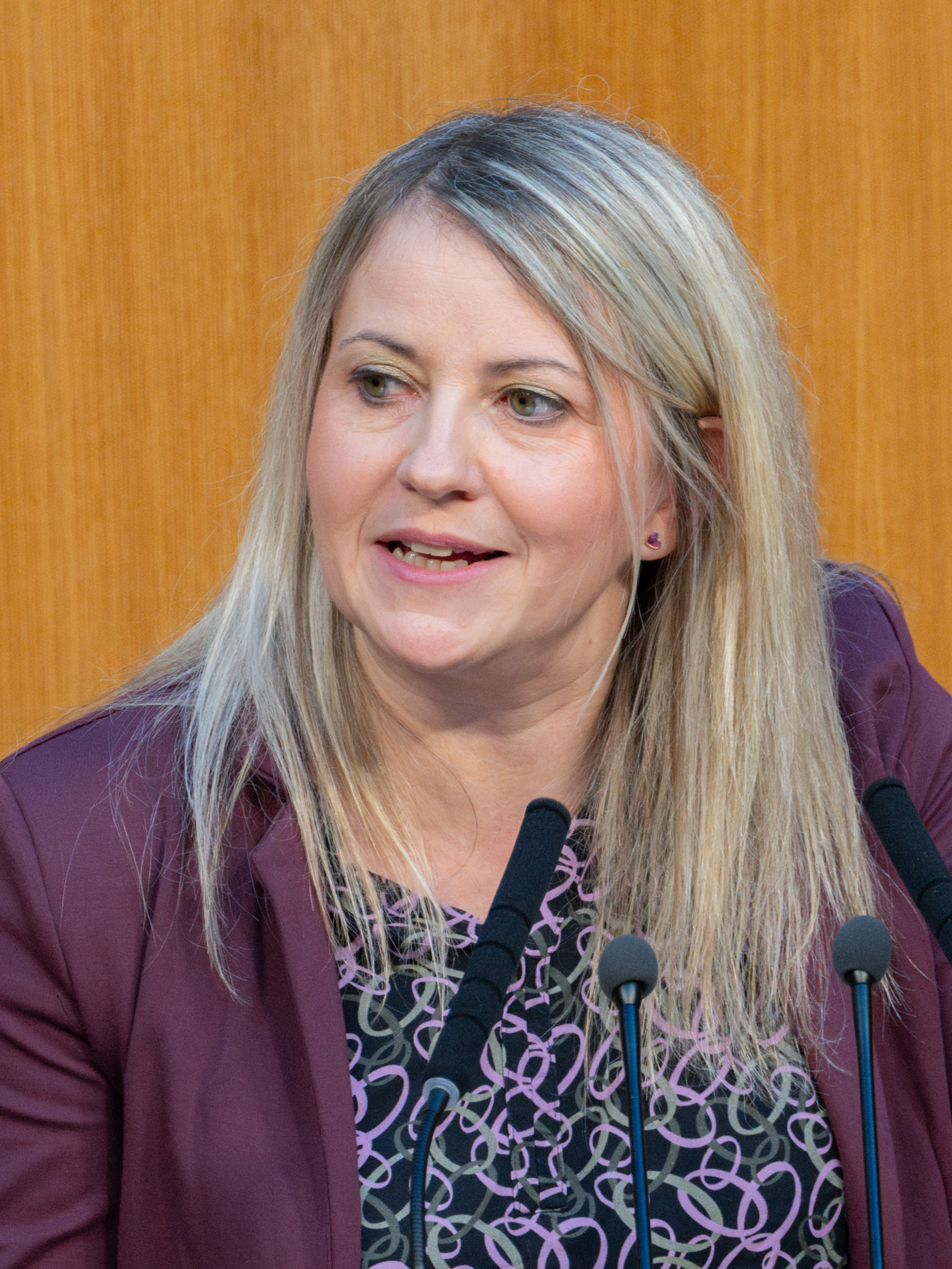
- Silvia Kumpan-Takacs in 2026

Member of the National Council
- Incumbent
- Assumed office 24 October 2024
- Constituency: Lower Austria

Personal details
- Born: 10 January 1979 (age 47)
- Party: Social Democratic Party

Silvia Kumpan-Takacs (born 10 January 1979) is an Austrian politician of the Social Democratic Party serving as a member of the National Council since 2024. She has been a city councillor of Rauchenwarth since 2015.
