= B. P. Wadia =

Indian theosophist and labour activist

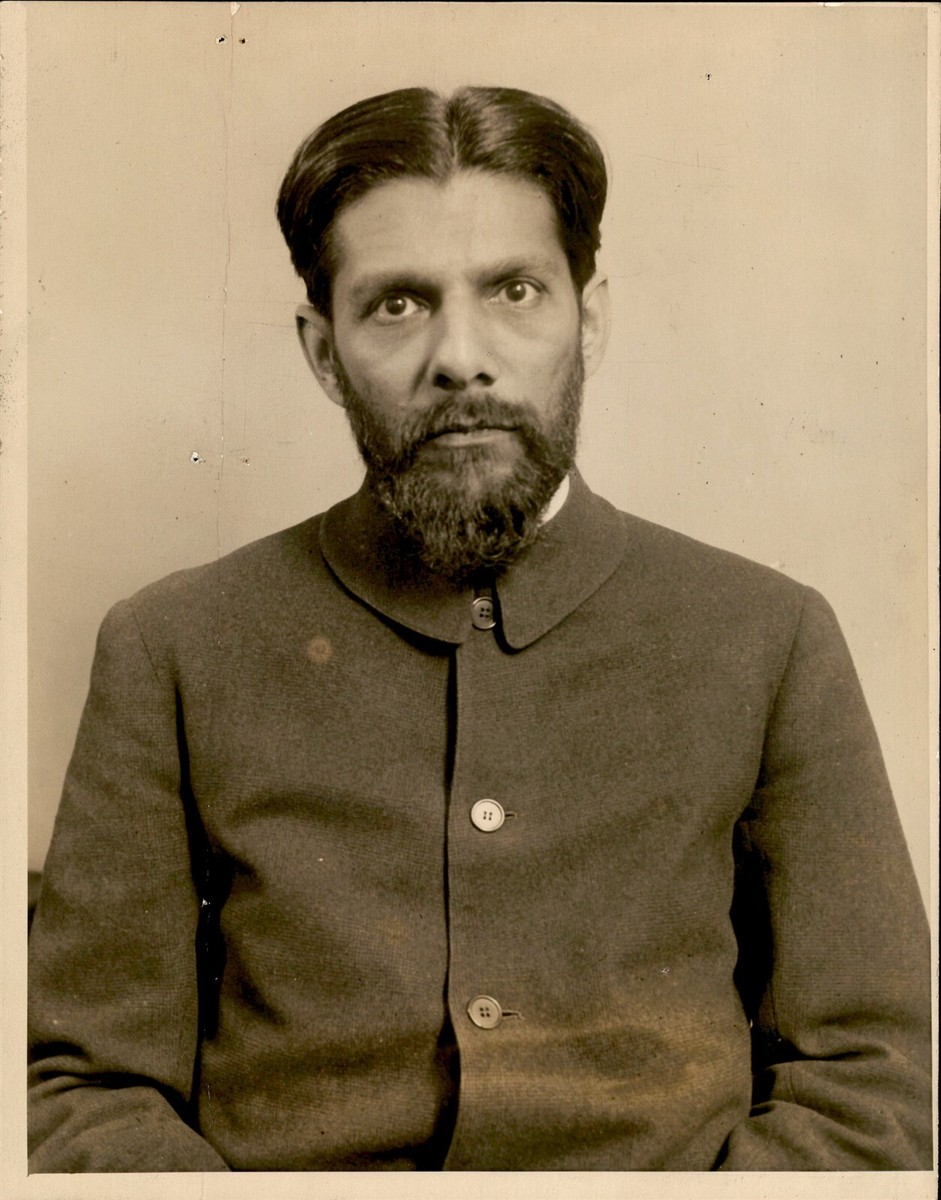
- Wadia in 1921
- Born: 8 October 1881; Bombay, British India
- Died: 20 August 1958 (aged 76); Bangalore, India
- Other names: Bahman Pestonji Wadia, Bomanji Pestonji Wadia, PBW
- Occupations: Theosophist, Labor activist
- Spouse: Sophia Wadia

Bahman Pestonji Wadia or Bomanji Pestonji Wadia (BP Wadia, B.P. Wadia or BPW) (* 8 October 1881 in Mumbai, India; † 20 August 1958 in Bangalore, India) was an Indian theosophist and labour activist.

In 1903 he joined the Theosophical Society in Mumbai and moved to Madras in 1908 to be part of Theosophical Society Adyar. He worked for the journal The Theosophist. He became part of United Lodge of Theosophists (ULT).

On 13 April 1918, along with V. Kalyanasundaram Mudaliar, Wadia founded the Madras Labour Union, one of India's first organised labour unions. He became president of the Madras Textile Workers' Union and engaged himself for workers' rights.

In 1919 he visited the ULT in Los Angeles and was very impressed. When he returned to Adyar in 1919, he tried to work for a change of direction in the TS Adyar, based on the ideals of the ULT, but did not succeed. He became disappointed and left the TS Adyar to work for the ULT in Los Angeles.

In 1923 he founded several lodges on the east coast of the States. In 1925 he founded a lodge in the UK. In 1928 a lodge was founded in France, in 1929 in Mumbai. Other lodges of the ULT were founded in the States, Europe and India. In 1930 he began publishing the journal The Aryan Path.

In 1928 he married Sophia Camacho (1901-1986).

In 1945 he founded The Indian Institute of World Culture (IIWC) in Bangalore.

A street in Bangalore, B.P. Wadia Road, is named after him.

== Works ==
- Growth through service. The Theosophical association of New York, New York 1922
- Problems of national and international politics. Theosophical association of New York, New York 1922
- Studies in "The secret doctrine“. Theosophy Co. (India), Bombay 1963
- The building of the home. Indian Institute of World Culture, Bangalore 1959
- The inner ruler. Theosophical association of New York, New York 1922
- Theosophy and new thought. The Cosmopolitan press, Bombay 1907
- Thus have I heard, leading articles from "The Aryan path“. Indian Institute of World Culture, Bangalore 1959
