= Stage Deli =

Coordinates: 40°45′48.35″N 73°58′54.64″W

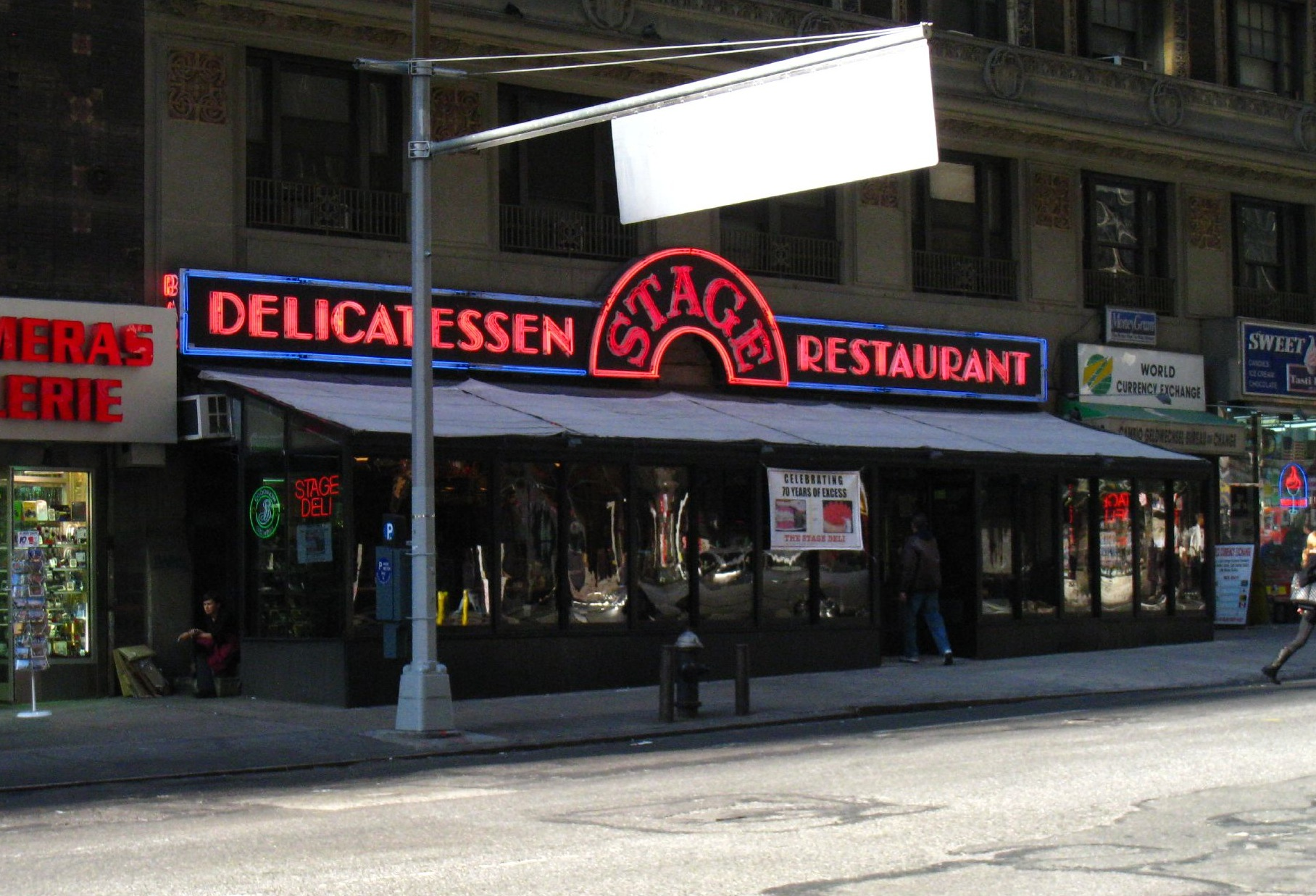
- Stage Deli seen in 2007
- Interactive map of Stage Deli

Restaurant information
- Established: 1937
- Closed: November 29, 2012; 13 years ago
- Dress code: Casual
- Location: 834 7th Avenue, Manhattan, New York City, New York, 10019, United States
- Website: Official site (archive)

The Stage Deli, located on Seventh Avenue just two blocks from Carnegie Hall, was a well-known New York City delicatessen, patronized by numerous celebrities. It was first opened in 1937 by Russian-Jewish immigrant Max Asnas. The deli was known for Broadway-themed dishes including the "Mamma Mia!" sandwich. It had other menu items named for the celebrities who had dined there, including Sarah Ferguson, Conan O' Brien, Adam Sandler, Dolly Parton, Martin Short, and Ron Blomberg.

In addition to serving regular meals, Stage Deli held special events including the Matzoh Bowl to determine the best matzoh ball soup.

The Stage Deli had a longstanding rivalry with the nearby Carnegie Deli. At one point, the rivals quarreled over which had the best pastrami, with the Stage Deli pointing out that the Carnegie Deli's pastrami was made with water from New Jersey, and the Carnegie Deli responding that the Stage Deli's pastrami, while made with New York water, was bought from a vendor instead of home-made. Thus, New Yorkers could get the same pastrami from any deli supplied by the same vendor. In September 2026, Carnegie Deli took over its old location.

A 1950 comedy album, The corned-beef Confucius, featuring Asnas "with some of Broadway's greatest comedians", was recorded at the deli.

Yankees teammates Mickey Mantle, Hank Bauer and Johnny Hopp shared an apartment above the deli in the early 1950s, and its baseball ties reached out of town to Pete Rose, who once complained of not having a sandwich in his honor.

The Stage Deli appeared in the background of the Law & Order episode "Discord" as detectives Briscoe and Logan wandered the street. It also appeared in an episode of Late Night with Conan O'Brien in 2001, in which Conan visited the restaurant to see the order which they named after him. He assumed that he was named after a sandwich, but instead learned his order was a choice of a soup and small salad.

The Stage Deli appeared in an episode of the sitcom Caroline in the City called "Caroline and the Sandwich". In the episode, the deli renames a sandwich (previously named after Jo Anne Worley) to name it after the main character in Caroline's cartoon strip, Caroline in the City. This leads to a backlash against her. Jo Anne and Caroline stage a feud to maximise the publicity.

The Stage Deli closed on November 29, 2012. The owners cited a downturn in business, coupled with rising rent as the reasons for the closing. The Stage Deli previously found in the Forum Shops of Caesars Palace in Las Vegas, Nevada closed in June 2008.

== See also ==
- List of Ashkenazi Jewish restaurants
- List of delicatessens
