= Robert Crosbie =

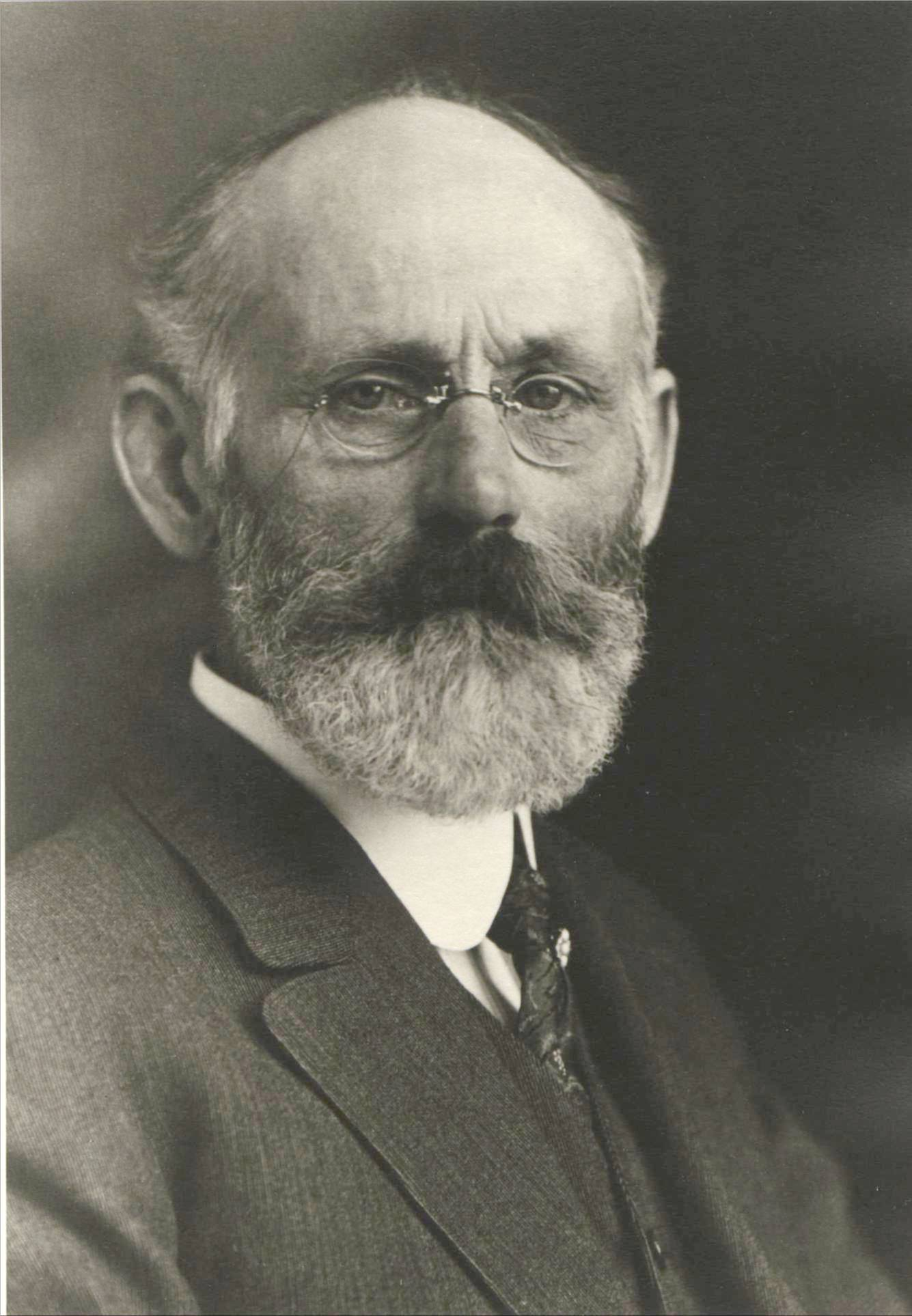
Robert Crosbie

Robert Crosbie (10 January 1849 – 25 June 1919) was a theosophist and founder of the United Lodge of Theosophists (ULT).

Crosbie was born in Montreal, Lower Canada. In 1902, he moved to Lomaland, Point Loma, California where he helped in building a theosophical community. In 1908 he published a letter To all open-minded Theosophists about his thoughts on the Theosophical Society. In February 1909 he founded the ULT in Los Angeles. The organization had no presidents or hierarchical structures. Emphasizing the universality of theosophy, the Declaration of the United Lodge of Theosophists states in part:

"It regards as Theosophists all who are engaged in the true service of Humanity, without distinction of race, creed, sex, condition or organization,(...)"

Much of the wording of the ULT Declaration is directly derived from statements found in the writings of William Q. Judge and H.P. Blavatsky. The expressed mission statement of the United Lodge of Theosophists is “To spread broadcast the original teachings of Theosophy as recorded in the writings of H.P. Blavatsky and William Q. Judge.”

In 1912 Crosbie first published the theosophical magazine "Theosophy". He also founded Theosophy School. In 1916 two new lodges of the ULT were opened in San Francisco and Berkeley, California. The ULT exists to this day, as an international association with lodges and study groups presently in 16 nations around the world.

Crosbie died in 1919 in Monterey, California.

== Works ==
- The Friendly Philosopher, Letters and Talks on Theosophy and the Theosophical Life. The Theosophy Company, Los Angeles 1934, 1945, latest reprint 2008
- Answers to Questions on The Ocean of Theosophy. 1933, The Theosophy Company, Los Angeles
- Notes on The Bhagavad-Gita with William Q. Judge. The Theosophy Company, Los Angeles
