= United Lodge of Theosophists =

Theosophist group

United Lodge of Theosophists Logo

The United Lodge of Theosophists or ULT is an informal and wholly voluntary association of students of Theosophy. It was founded in 1909, mainly through the efforts of Robert Crosbie. The first parent lodge of the ULT was started in Los Angeles by Robert Crosbie and seven other associates through the adoption of its Declaration on February 18, 1909. Owing largely to the revival efforts of B.P. Wadia after Crosbie's death, there are currently about twenty active lodges spread all over the world. The ULT is considered to be part of the second generation or the third section of the Theosophical Movement started in 1875 by H.P. Blavatsky in New York. Presently, it is also one of the existing four main "branches" of the original Theosophical Movement. The following founding principles when taken as a whole, sets apart the ULT from the other Theosophical Organizations:

1. Recognition of W.Q. Judge as H.P. Blavatsky's colleague and co-worker from the beginning and hence as one of the original founders of the Theosophical Movement
2. Exclusive adherence to the unaltered works of H.P. Blavatsky and W.Q. Judge along with only those other works that are philosophically in consonance with the aforementioned
3. Rejection of any other "authorities" in the form of "leaders" or "teachers" and reference to all of its associates as "students" with emphasis on self-reliance
4. Absence of organizational elements such as constitution, by-laws or officers and complete reliance on the "similarity of aim, purpose and teaching," as the only basis of unity
5. Anonymity of living persons who write on behalf of ULT to protect against exaltation of personalities and self-advertising

ULT Los Angeles publishes the Theosophy Magazine which was started by Robert Crosbie in 1912. It was the revival of an earlier periodical called The Path that was edited by W.Q. Judge. ULT India publishes the Theosophical Movement Magazine, founded under B.P. Wadia in 1930 in Mumbai. ULT Santa Barbara publishes a quarterly periodical called Vidya, and uses Concord Grove Press to publish theosophical texts including a pamphlet series on themes from The Secret Doctrine. The Theosophy Company was registered in 1925 on behalf of ULT as a fiduciary agent and an eleemosynary, non-profit corporation to publish photographic facsimile of the Original Editions of books by H.P. Blavatsky and W.Q. Judge.

== History ==
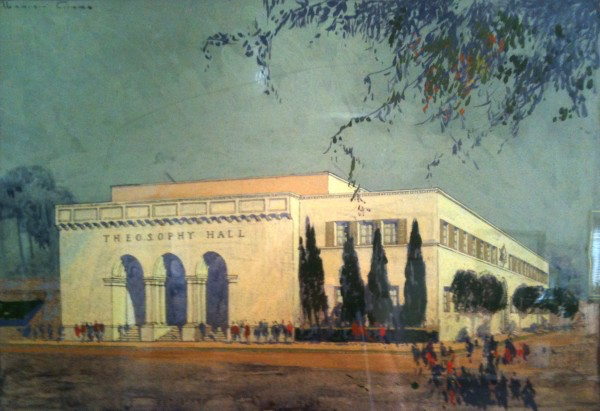
Artist's rendering of Theosophy Hall - United Lodge of Theosophists, Los Angeles

The history of ULT began with Robert Crosbie coming in contact with H.P. Blavatsky in 1887 and his subsequent association with the Theosophical Society or TS in Boston. Based on H.P. Blavatsky's instructions, he placed himself under the direct guidance of W.Q. Judge. Following the death of the original founders of the movement, Robert Crosbie was witness to the ensuing rivalries around "leadership", "authority" and "succession" surrounding Katherine Tingley, who headed the American section and Annie Besant, who headed the international section from India. Initially, Robert Crosbie gave his support to Katherine Tingley and went to Point Loma in 1900 to be of assistance there. However, by 1904, he felt the original teachings of Theosophy were almost completely eclipsed by Katherine Tingley's sensational programs. Convinced that further effort was futile, he quietly left Point Loma and moved to Los Angeles. By February 1909, he had gathered around him seven individuals as part of a study group, four of whom were new to Theosophy. This nucleus, under Robert Crosbie's guidance, set to the task of restoring Theosophy along the original lines of its founders without organizational distractions. In the meantime, the original 1888 version of The Secret Doctrine was out of print and replaced by Annie Besant's "Third and Revised Edition". This edition was found to contain tens of thousands of alterations and major distortions. This and other material that diverged significantly from H.P. Blavatsky's original presentation was denominated Neo-Theosophy. Robert Crosbie denounced Neo-Theosophy and considered it along with other leadership claims and rivalries in the Theosophical Society to be the result of the accentuation of personality, in the Theosophical sense of the lower or illusionary self. Hence the Declaration of the ULT was drawn to emphasize an impersonal, self-reliant, non-hierarchical, non-organizational spirit and loyalty to the original founders and their unaltered message.

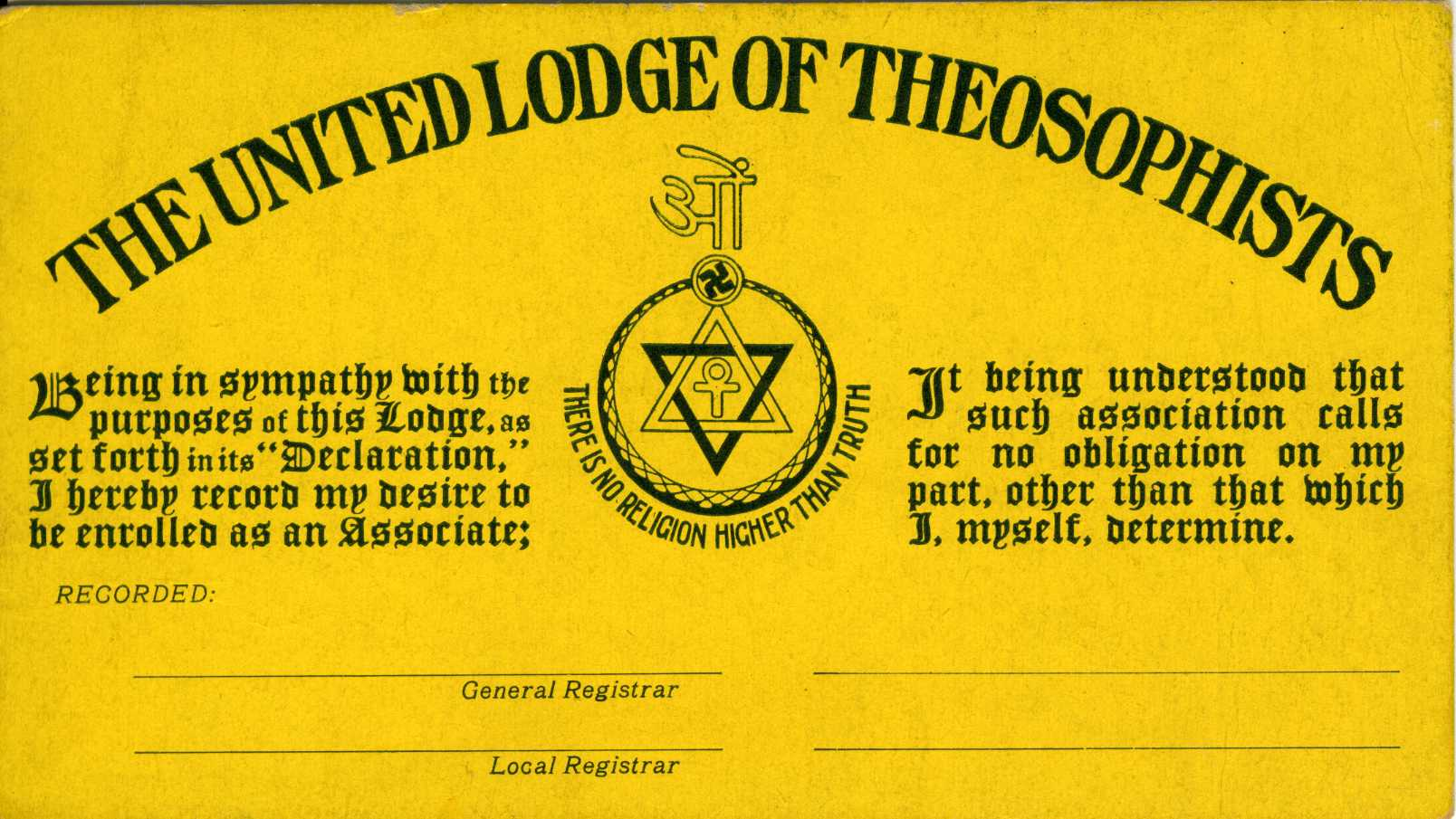
The card that members sign to enroll as an associate of ULT

In November 1919, five months after Robert Crosbie's death, B.P Wadia, a predominant member of the Theosophical Society Adyar visited America and happened to come across ULT Los Angeles. There he discovered the works of W.Q. Judge who was considered a renegade by the Theosophical Society under Annie Besant and Col. Olcott. Furthermore, he found the reformation he was seeking of the Theosophical Society in ULT's Declaration of purpose and its mission of "pure Theosophy" without organizational distractions. He then went back to India with the hope of changing the attitude of the leaders of the Theosophical Society, to return to the original teachings, set right the wrong that was done to W.Q. Judge and mend the schism in the Theosophical Movement. Finding that his efforts were unsuccessful, he resigned from the Theosophical Society on 18 July 1922 and joined the ULT. Between 1922 and 1928, he stayed in America and founded ULT lodges in New York, Washington D.C., and Philadelphia. And on his return trip to India via Europe, he established ULT lodges in Antwerp, Amsterdam, London, and Paris. Back in India, he started ULT lodges in Mumbai and Bengaluru.

== Active Centers ==
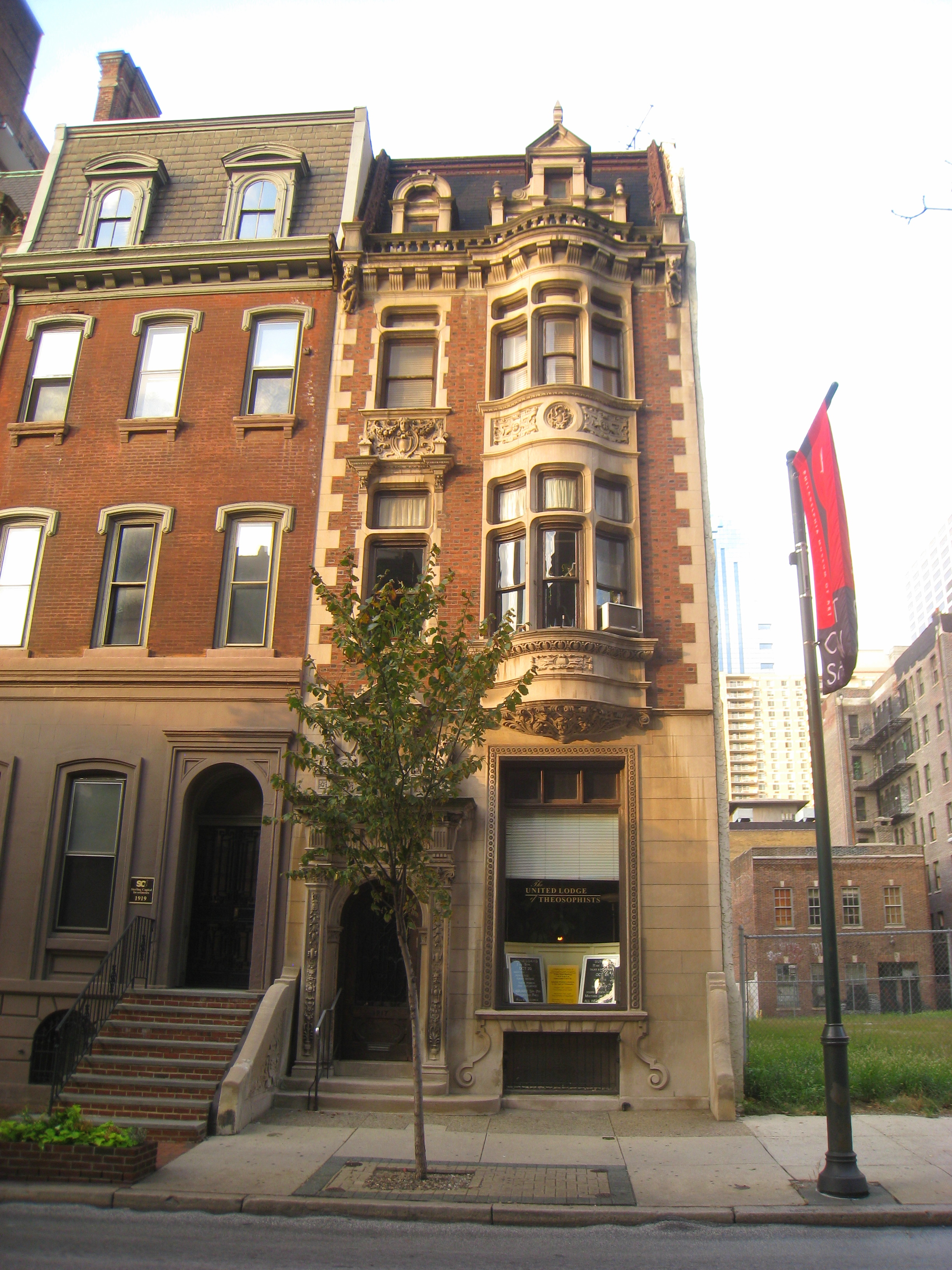
United Lodge of Theosophists, Philadelphia

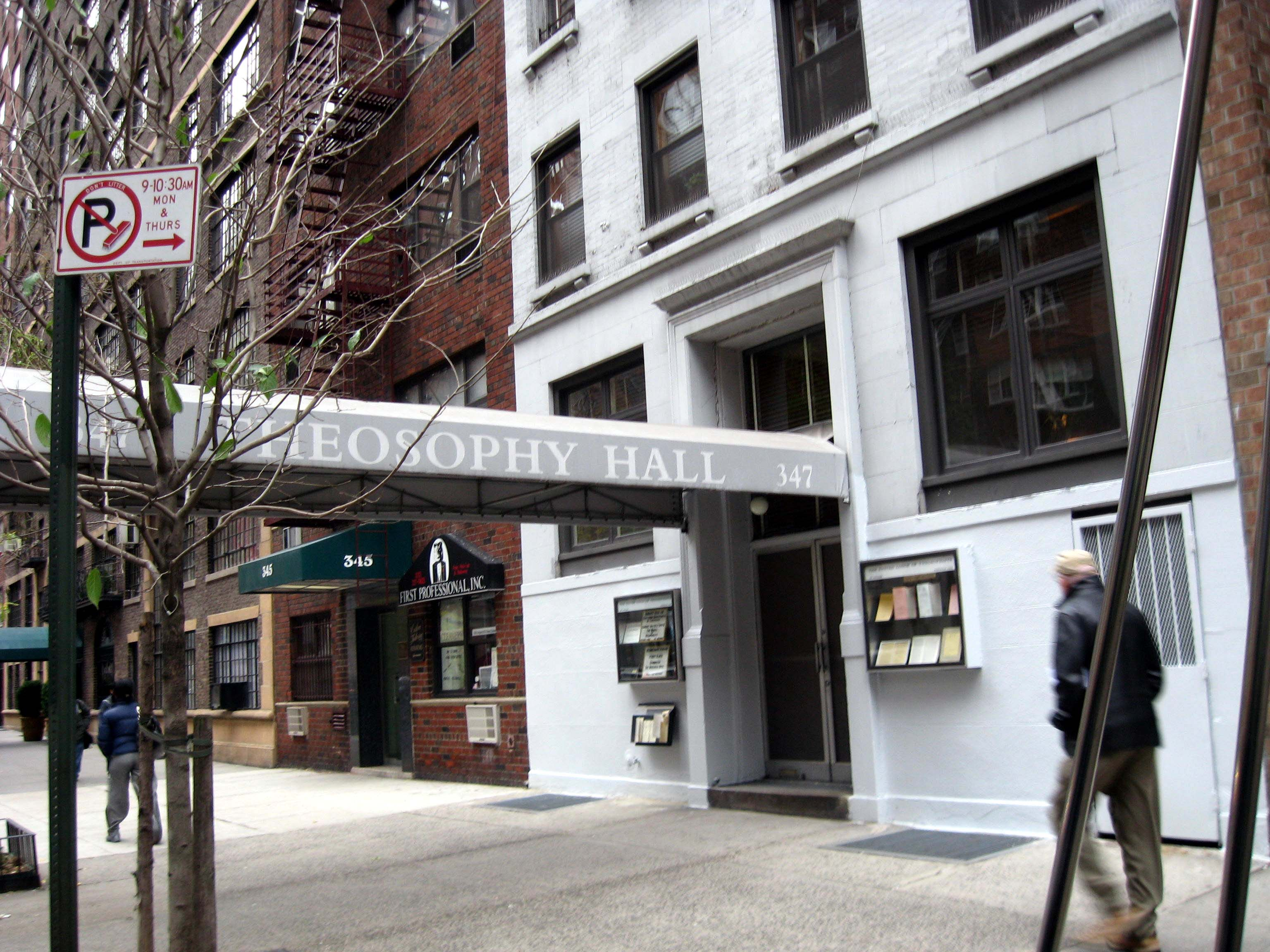
Theosophy Hall, New York

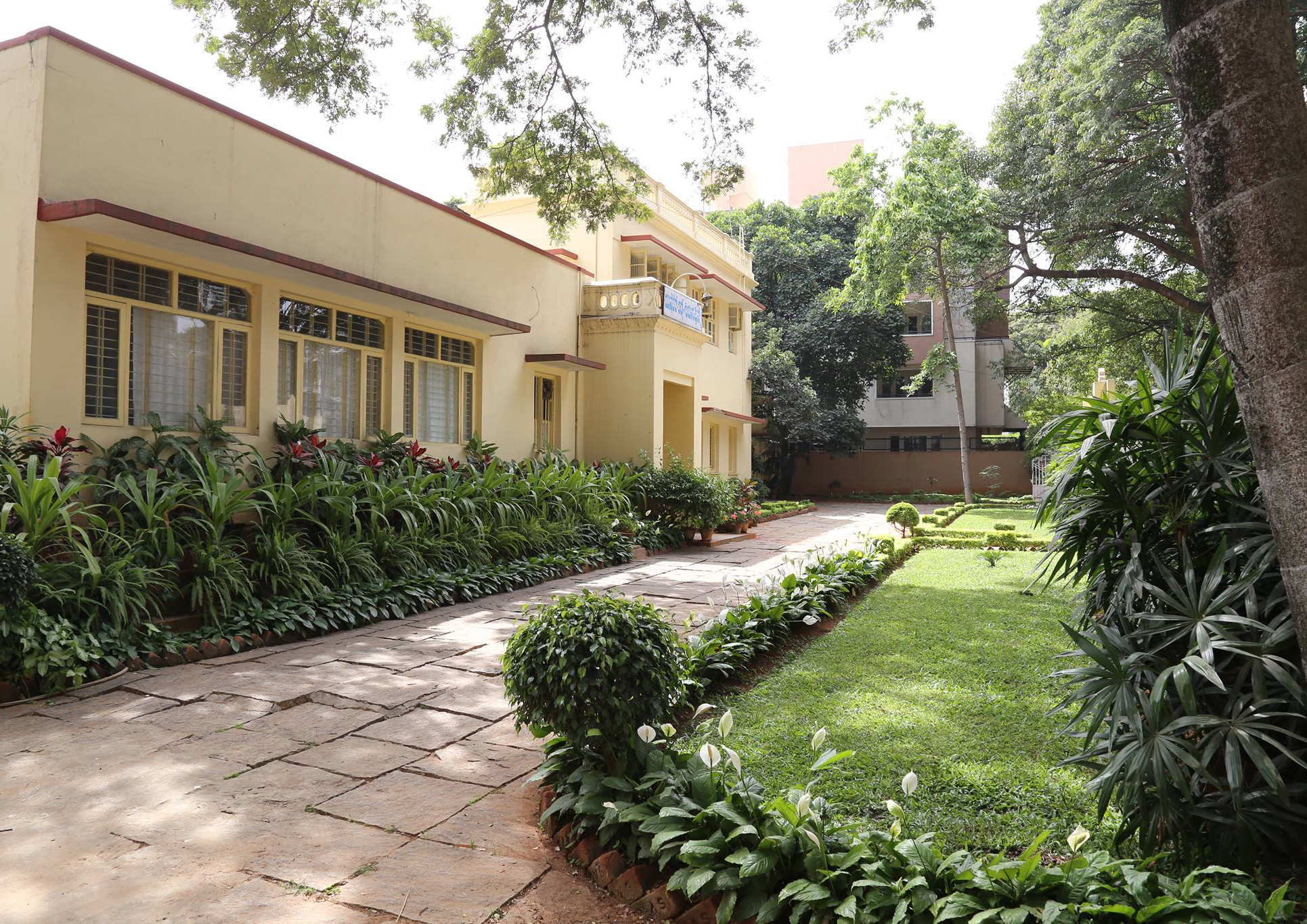
Maitri Bhavan, Bengaluru, India

The first ULT lodge founded in 1909 by Robert Crosbie :

- 245 West 33rd Street, LOS ANGELES, CALIF., 90007, USA (Los Angeles, CA)

Founded between 1923 and 1928 under the guidance of B.P Wadia during his stay in America :

- 347 East 72nd Street, NEW YORK, N.Y., 10021, USA (New York, New York)
- 1917 Walnut Street, PHILADELPHIA, PENN., 19103, USA (Philadelphia, PA)
- 4865 Cordell Ave., Suite 230, Bethesda, (WASHINGTON D.C.) MARYLAND 20814, USA (Washington D.C.)

Established in 1928 during B.P Wadia's journey from America back to India via Europe:

- Robert Crosbie House, 62 Queen's Gardens, LONDON W2 3AH, ENGLAND (London, England)
- Frans van Heymbeecklaan 6, DEURNE-ANTWERP B-2100, BELGIUM (Theosofie Antwerpen)
- 11 bis, Rue Kepler, PARIS 75116, FRANCE (Paris, France)
- Geunieerde loge van Theosofen, Celebesstraat 4, 2585 TJ DEN HAAG (THE HAGUE), NETHERLANDS (Inactive)

First ULT lodge in India, opened on November 17, 1929 under B.P Wadia's leadership:

- Theosophy Hall, 40 NewMarine Lines, MUMBAI 400020, INDIA (ULT India)

A sister lodge of the Mumbai center started in 1938 under B.P Wadia:

- Nalini Kunj, Sri Marubai Gamdevi Mandir Rd., MATUNGA, MUMBAI 400019, INDIA (Inactive)

Named "Maitri Bhavan", this lodge was started on the 12th of August 1942 by B.P Wadia:

- 4 M.N Krishna Rao Road, Basavangudi, BANGALORE 560004, INDIA (ULT India)

Study centers started organically by students:

- 799 Adelaide Street N, LONDON, ONTARIO N5Y 2L8, CANADA (London, Ontario)
- Köpenhamnsvägen 13 C, 217 55 MALMÖ, SWEDEN (Malmo, Sweden)
- 77 West Encanto Blvd., PHOENIX, ARIZONA, 85003, USA (Phoenix, AZ)
- 3766 El Cajon Blvd., SAN DIEGO, CALIFORNIA, 92105, USA (San Diego, CA)
- 326 West Sola Street, SANTA BARBARA, CALIFORNIA, 93101, USA (Santa Barbara, CA)
- 17, Cours Henri Chabeuf, 21000 DIJON, FRANCE (Dijon, France)

== Sources ==
=== Unaffiliated ===
- Lewis, James R. (2002). The Encyclopedia of Cults, Sects, and New Religions. Prometheus Books, Publishers. pp. 760–762. ISBN 978-1-61592-738-8.
- Sharma, Suresh K.; Sharma, Usha (2004). Cultural and Religious Heritage of India: Cultural and religious reform movements. Mittal Publications. pp. 219–238. ISBN 978-81-7099-963-8.
- Akman, Kubilay (2015). The Esoteric Paths: Philosophies, Teachings and Secrets. Lulu.com. pp. 258–262. ISBN 978-1-329-53807-8.
- Kuhn, Alvin Boyd (1930). Theosophy: a modern revival of ancient wisdom. Kila, MT: Kessinger. pp. 183–184. ISBN 978-1564591753.
- Campbell, Bruce F. (1980). Ancient Wisdom Revived: A History of the Theosophical Movement. University of California Press. pp. 143–146. ISBN 9780520039681.
- Hammer, Olav; Rothstein, Mikael (2013). Handbook of the Theosophical Current. BRILL. pp. 73–75. ISBN 978-90-04-23597-7.
- Melton, J. Gordon; Baumann, Martin (2010). Religions of the World: A Comprehensive Encyclopedia of Beliefs and Practices: A Comprehensive Encyclopedia of Beliefs and Practices. ABC-CLIO. p. 2988. ISBN 978-1-59884-204-3.

=== Affiliated ===
- Crosbie, Robert (1945). The Friendly Philosopher: Letters And Talks on Theosophy And the Theosophical Life (reprint ed.). Kessinger Publishing. pp. 406–414. ISBN 9781417976904.
- Theosophical Movement (1951). Theosophical Movement 1875-1950 (4th rev ed.). Los Angeles: Cunningham Press. pp. 316–318. ISBN 0938998145.
- Kell, Wane (1998). "B. P. WADIA - A Life of Service to Mankind". United Lodge of Theosophists, India. Unpublished.
- Wadia, Bahman P. (1922). To All Fellow Theosophists and Members of the Theosophical Society. A Statement. Unpublished.
