= Theosophical Society in America =

Nonprofit organization

The Theosophical Society in America (TSA) is a member-based nonprofit organization dedicated to the teaching of Theosophy and affiliated with the international Theosophical Society based in Adyar, Chennai, India. The name "Theosophical Society in America" was legally adopted by the American Theosophical Society in 1934. Previously, other organizations had used the same name during the years 1895–98 and 1898–1908.

== History ==
Russian expatriate Helena Blavatsky and American colonel Henry Steel Olcott founded the Theosophical Society with attorney William Quan Judge and others in late 1875 in New York City. After its two major co-founders departed for India in 1879 to establish the international headquarters of the Society in Adyar, India (near Madras, now known as Chennai), Judge carried on the work of promoting Theosophy within the United States. By 1886, he had established an American section of the international Society with branches in fourteen cities. Rapid growth took place under his guidance: by 1895, there were 102 American branches with nearly six thousand members. Blavatsky died in 1891, leaving Olcott and English social activist Annie Besant as the principal leaders of the international movement based in Adyar and Judge heading the American section.

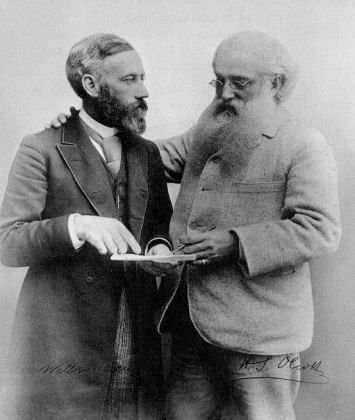
Judge and Olcott in 1891

In 1894, an event known as the "Judge Affair" occurred. Judge came under fire after being accused of falsifying correspondence with the so-called Mahatmas. Although he denied the accusation, the event caused a break in the Society known as the "Great Split". Partially due to the "Great Split", during the contentious Ninth Annual Convention of the American section in 1895, 83 Theosophical lodges voted for autonomy from the international Theosophical Society Adyar. The international president-founder, Olcott, interpreted this action as secession and revoked the charters of those lodges, whose members reorganized into the first Theosophical Society in America under Judge. After Judge's death the following year, Katherine Tingley stepped into the leadership of that organization; in 1898, she folded the Theosophical Society in America into the Universal Brotherhood, resulting in the Universal Brotherhood and Theosophical Society. After several changes in location and name, the successor organization is now known as the Theosophical Society Pasadena. Tingley's authority over the Universal Brotherhood and Theosophical Society was based in spiritual power and brought back reverence for occultism and spiritualism. Many Theosophists did not approve of the absolute authority she claimed over the Society, so a Theosophist named Hargrove and a few hundred others left Tingley's society. His group became the Theosophical Society in America (Hargrove). Other groups that split off from Tingley's organization over the years became the Theosophical Society of New York, the United Lodge of Theosophists, and the Temple of the People in Halcyon, California. The second Theosophical Society in America, headed by Ernest Temple Hargrove, dropped the words "in America" from its name in 1908.

Five American lodges that had opposed the 1895 secession retained their affiliation with the international Society in Adyar. They formed a new American section known as the American Theosophical Society under the leadership of Alexander Fullerton. Extensive lecture tours by Annie Besant and Constance Wachtmeister elicited much new interest in the American Theosophical Society, so that by 1900, the organization claimed 1286 members and 71 branches.

In an attempt to clarify the complex history of the Theosophical movement in the United States, Dorothy Bell has created a diagram along the lines of a family tree, which can be viewed at American Family Tree of Theosophy.

The American Theosophical Society was legally renamed The Theosophical Society in America in 1934 and has existed under that name since. Like other Theosophical groups, the organization aspires to educate the public about the principles of Theosophy through publications, public programs, and local group activities.

== Philosophy ==
In the mid- to late 1800s, the Theosophical Society as a whole took an experiential approach to religion that was, in part, a reaction to Orthodox Christianity's focus on dogma. This is why much of Theosophy is focused on an ostensibly scientific conception of religion, with laws and theories of its own. For Theosophists, a scientific approach is how one can get to the common truths that Theosophists believe are behind all religious traditions. Although Theosophy is largely concerned with the more intellectual path to truth and to the Objects, because Blavatsky's involvement in the occult spheres, Theosophy has taken influence from Western mysticism, spiritualism, and esotericism. Later, critiques of her occult practices caused a general move away from spiritualism, but it remained an undertone in later practice. It was after Blavatsky and Olcott journeyed to India in 1879 that Asian religion and philosophy became so central to Theosophist philosophy. Thus, Theosophists in America drew inspiration for their philosophies from Asian religions, such as Buddhism and Hinduism, as well as Neoplatonic and Gnostic texts. Using these philosophies, Theosophists endeavored to trace a common religious and philosophical origin back to the East.

Currently, members of the Theosophical Society follow the three Objects and continue to practice interest in study and spiritual self-transformation. Theosophists consider that belief should be the result of individual study, experience, and insight, rather than reliance on dogma. They see each religion as an expression of divine wisdom, adapted to the needs of a particular time and place. Theosophy regards the universe as alive and interrelated, with an intelligent order guiding the cyclical evolution of all life. The Theosophical Society supports the right of individual freedom of thought for every person, and no doctrine is in any way binding on any member of the Society.

== Objects ==
The three declared Objects of the Theosophical Society are:

- To form a nucleus of the universal brotherhood of humanity, without distinction of race, creed, sex, caste or color.
- To encourage the comparative study of religion, philosophy, and science.
- To investigate unexplained laws of nature and the powers latent in humanity

== Mission statement ==
The Theosophical Society in America encourages open-minded inquiry into world religions, philosophy, science, and the arts in order to understand the wisdom of the ages, respect the unity of all life, and help people explore spiritual self-transformation.

== Organization ==
The modern Theosophical Society in America is a member-based not-for-profit corporation. It is incorporated in the state of Illinois with federal 501(c)(3) tax-exempt status. The national headquarters has been located in Wheaton, Illinois since 1927. About 115 local groups include branches (also called lodges) and smaller study centers. As of 2008, the membership comprised about 4000 people.

== Leadership ==
The TSA is governed by a board of directors that meets at the national headquarters. Officers include a president, vice president, national treasurer, and national secretary. Two directors are elected by members from each of three geographical districts in the United States.

The national president also has the title of General Secretary for the American section of the Theosophical Society Adyar based in Chennai, India, and participates in the General Council that governs the international Society. These are the presidents since the 1895 reorganization of the American Society:

| Term of Office | President |
|---|---|
| 1895–1907 | Alexander Fullerton |
| 1907–1912 | Weller van Hook |
| 1912–1920 | A. P. Warrington |
| 1920–1931 | L. W. Rogers |
| 1931–1945 | Sidney A. Cook |
| 1945–1960 | James S. Perkins |
| 1960–1965 | Henry A. Smith |
| 1965–1974 | Joy Mills |
| 1974–1975 | Ann Wylie |
| 1975–1987 | Dora van Gelder Kunz |
| 1987–1993 | Dorothy Abbenhouse |
| 1993–2002 | John Algeo |
| 2002–2011 | Betty Bland |
| 2011–2017 | Tim Boyd |
| 2017–2023 | Barbara Hebert |
| 2023–Present | Douglas Keene |

== National headquarters ==
Under Alexander Fullerton, the American Theosophical Society (now known as Theosophical Society in America) was based in New York City, but his successor, Dr. Weller van Hook, moved the headquarters to Chicago in 1907. A. P. Warrington transferred operations to Hollywood in 1912, where the Theosophical colony of Krotona was established. Most of the colony later moved north to Ojai, California, while the headquarters returned to Chicago in 1920.

During his presidency, L. W. Rogers sought to establish a permanent headquarters in a central and accessible location. He led a search for land where a new headquarters could be established. Dozens of sites within 500 miles (800 km) of Chicago were considered before an appropriate property was located in Wheaton, Illinois. This western suburb of Chicago met all the search criteria in that it was centrally located, with excellent rail transportation, a serene rural atmosphere, and affordable land. In 1925 the Society purchased almost 10 acres (40,000 m^{2}) of farmland, and immediately began planting a grove of trees.

At the recommendation of Theosophist and architect Claude Fayette Bragdon, the Chicago architectural firm of Pond & Pond, Martin & Lloyd was engaged to design the headquarters building. Annie Besant laid cornerstone on 29 August 1926 in a ceremony that was attended by Jiddu Krishnamurti and a huge crowd. In September 1927 staff members moved operations to the new structure, which was eventually named the L. W. Rogers Building. Designed in a collegiate Gothic style by Irving Kane Pond, the three-story building consists of offices, library, classroom, auditorium, meditation room, kitchen, dining room, garage, and residential wing for staff members and visitors. In 1931 Mrs. C. Shillard-Smith, commissioned painter Richard Blossom Farley to create the colorful mural of evolving life that is still on view in the two-story lobby.

The campus grew over the years, mostly through donations of land by generous members. In 1932, the headquarters estate came to be known as "Olcott", in honor of co-founder Colonel Henry Steel Olcott. For several decades, postal mail was delivered simply to "Olcott, Wheaton, Illinois." The property now comprises almost 42 acres (170,000 m^{2}). The Quest Book Shop and Theosophical Publishing House are housed in the Mills Building, named after president Joy Mills. The scenic grounds are open to the public, and feature a pond, groves, gardens, and a labyrinth. Video tours of the campus are available.

== National library and archives ==
Books and periodicals have always been extremely important to Theosophists as tools for study. In 1922, L. W. Rogers established the national library, and when the headquarters building was constructed in Wheaton a two-story library was incorporated into the design. The original space was expanded in 1962–63 to add offices, meeting rooms, stacks, and basement storage.

The Henry S. Olcott Memorial Library houses books, periodicals, pamphlets, microfilm, videos, and audio recordings. The collection focuses on Theosophy, religion, science, philosophy, art, biography, and health. The reading room is open to the public six days each week; members of the Society and other library patrons can borrow library materials by mail or in person. The library belongs to the DuPage Library System MAGIC consortium and the American Theological Library Association, and works in close cooperation with the Emily Sellon Memorial Library at the New York Theosophical Society, and the Krotona Library in Ojai, California.

Archival collections include organizational records, and also special collections of papers from Boris de Zirkoff, Mary K. Neff, Fritz and Dora Kunz, and others. Records of the American Theosophical movement before 1898 are in the archives of the Theosophical Society Pasadena. A rare book room also exists in the Wheaton headquarters.

== Activities and programs ==
The national center and local groups offer lectures, study groups, workshops, and other programs to members and the general public. Subject matter is wide-ranging to facilitate the study of comparative religion, philosophy, science, health, and art. Classes have included Hatha yoga, qigong, Therapeutic touch, and many forms of meditation.

Some notable speakers at national programs have included the 14th Dalai Lama, Bede Griffiths, Lama Anagarika Govinda, Ram Dass, Stephan A. Hoeller, Huston Smith, Rupert Sheldrake, Ian Stevenson, Fritjof Capra, Amit Goswami, Ravi Ravindra, and Jean Houston. The Society has also sponsored regional and national conferences focused on special topics such as education, science, and healing. Hundreds of programs have been recorded or webcast, with many available free online. The Theosophical Community serves as a means of conducting group discussions and other social networking.

== Publishing ==
The Theosophical Society in America has published books, pamphlets, and periodicals since its earliest days. The Theosophical Publishing House publishes books under the Quest Books imprint on a broad array of topics including Theosophy, transpersonal psychology, comparative religion, ecology, spiritual growth, and health. In 2023, Quest Books was acquired by Red Wheel/Weiser.

Quest magazine focuses on philosophy, religion, science, and the arts; articles from some past issues are available online. Messenger is a newsletter for members, providing news of organizational activities and board actions. A free monthly electronic newsletter is distributed by e-mail to members and other interested people. Many of the branch locations, federations, and retreat centers produce their own newsletters and program listings.

== Quest Book Shops ==
Quest Book Shops are commercial enterprises operated by the Theosophical Society in America and its affiliates to sell books, recordings, and other items of interest to students of Theosophy. Locations include shops in Wheaton, Illinois; New York City; Seattle; and Ojai, California.

== Affiliated organizations ==
The Theosophical Order of Service (TOS) engages in service projects in seven areas: animal welfare; art and music; ecology; family and children; healing; peace; and social service.

Theosophical Book Gift Institute (TBGI) distributes Theosophical books free to libraries and prisoners.

Order of the Knights of the Round Table sponsors activities for children and adults, and Young Theosophists (YT) is a young adult group.

The Krotona Institute of Theosophy in Ojai, California, offers classes in Theosophical subjects.

Four retreat centers facilitate fellowship and study in serene natural settings:

- Camp Indralaya on Orcas Island in Washington state
- Far Horizons retreat center in Kings Canyon National Park in California
- Ozark Theosophical Camp in Sulphur Springs, Arkansas
- Pumpkin Hollow Retreat Center at Craryville, New York

== Other Theosophical societies in the United States ==
The most prominent organizations now supporting study of Theosophy in the United States apart from the Theosophical Society in America are the Theosophical Society Pasadena, and the United Lodge of Theosophists (ULT), based in Los Angeles. These three organizations have worked together cordially, most notably at the 1993 Parliament of the World's Religions in Chicago. Collaborative efforts at that event included panel discussions and audiovisual productions: Ultimate Concerns, Theosophic Worldview, and Inter-Theosophical Dialogue: the Theosophical Movement Past and Future.

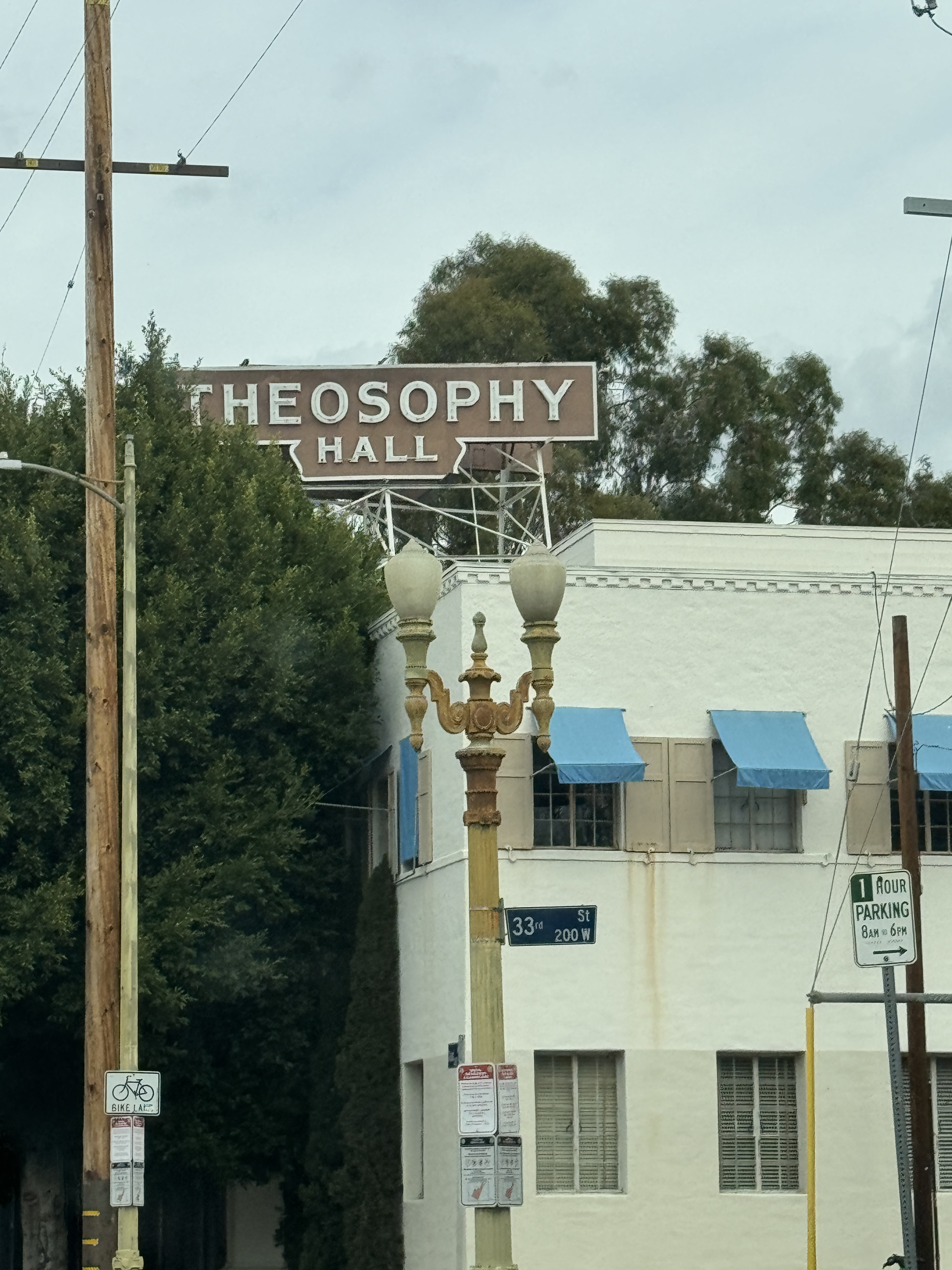
Theosophy Hall, Los Angeles, California

The Pasadena group is composed of sections in nine countries, and offers a library, correspondence courses, study groups, publications, and an extensive array of full-text Theosophical literature on its web page. Members supplement study of the Helena Blavatsky works with writings by William Quan Judge, Katherine Tingley, Gottfried de Purucker, and others.

The ULT, founded by Robert Crosbie, is dedicated to the study of the writings of Helena Blavatsky and William Quan Judge as printed from original plates or from photographic reproductions of original texts. Twenty-two lodges and ten study groups are located in fourteen countries.

By way of comparison, the modern Theosophical Society in America bases its studies on Helena Blavatsky, but draws from a broad group of other Theosophical teachers, including Annie Besant, Alfred Percy Sinnett, Charles Webster Leadbeater, Curuppumullage Jinarajadasa, Ernest Wood, Clara Codd, Geoffrey Hodson, Nilakanta Sri Ram, Joy Mills, Radha Burnier, Stephan A. Hoeller, Robert Ellwood, and John Algeo.

== Sources ==
- Ashcraft, W. Michael Ashcraft. The Dawn of the New Cycle. Knoxville: University of Tennessee Press, 2002.
- Campbell, Bruce F. Ancient Wisdom Revived: A History of the Theosophical Movement. Berkeley: University of California Press, 1980.
- Gomes, Michael. The Dawning of the Theosophical Movement. Wheaton, Ill.: Theosophical Publishing House, 1987.
- Jinarajadasa, Curuppumallage. The Golden Book of the Theosophical Society: a Brief History of the Society's Growth from 1875 to 1955. Adyar, Madras, India: Theosophical Publishing House, 1925.
- Mills, Joy. 100 Years of Theosophy: A History of the Theosophical Society in America. Wheaton, Ill.: Theosophical Publishing House, 1987.
- Ransom, Josephine. A Short History of the Theosophical Society. Adyar, Madras, India: Theosophical Publishing House, 1938.
- Theosophical Society in America. A History of Theosophy and the Theosophical Society: A Study Course. Wheaton, Illinois: Theosophical Society in America, 1953.
