= Mabel Collins =

British anti-vivisectionist (1851–1927)

Minna Mabel Collins
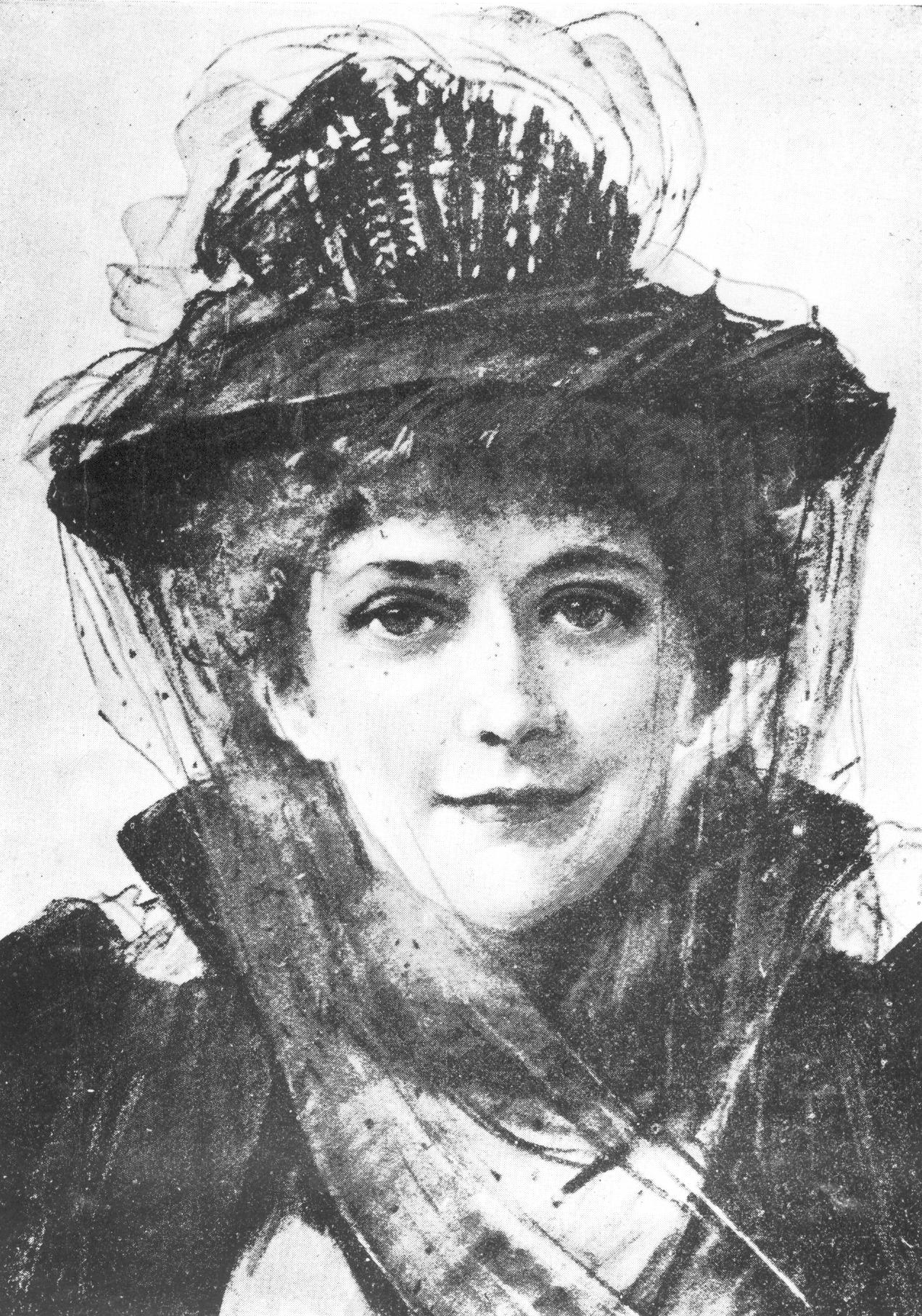
- Collins in 1888
- Born: 9 September 1851; St Peter Port, Guernsey
- Died: 31 March 1927 (aged 75)
- Occupations: Anti-vivisectionist, writer
- Spouse: Robert Keningale Cook (died 1886)
- Children: 1

Minna Mabel Collins (9 September 1851 – 31 March 1927) was a British anti-vivisectionist, occultist and author of over 46 books. She was an important figure in the Theosophical Society during the latter part of the nineteenth century but became critical of Helena Blavatsky and Theosophy after being expelled from the Society.

== Life ==
Collins was born in St Peter Port, Guernsey. She was the daughter of Mortimer Collins. She was a writer of popular occult novels, a fashion writer and an anti-vivisection campaigner. Collins was chairman of the Incorporated Parliamentary Association for the Abolition of Vivisection. She was a vegetarian.

In 1871 Collins married Keningale Robert Cook (1845–1886), a stockbroker and writer who was associated with the Vegetarian Society. Collins joined the Theosophical Society in the 1880s and assisted Helena Blavatsky in editing her Lucifer magazine. Collins left the Theosophical Society in 1889 over teaching differences. Biographer Marion Meade has noted that Collins was expelled from the Theosophical Society for flirting with other members but this reason was doubtful as Blavatsky had disliked Collins. Collins later became a critic of Theosophy and allied herself with Elliott Coues in criticizing Blavatsky and claims from the Theosophical Society.

Collins authored The Idyll of the White Lotus (1884) and Light on the Path (1885). It was alleged by Theosophists including Charles Webster Leadbeater that these books were dictated to Collins by Masters of the Ancient Wisdom. Collins denied these allegations and stated that no master had dictated the books, she had written them herself. She also objected to Charles Leadbeater's introduction and notes in the Theosophical Publishing House edition of Light on the Path in 1911.

In the 1890s, Collins was using her legal name Mabel Cook and living at 63 York Terrace in London with her child. In 1909, she wrote a political play called Outlawed with Alice Chapin. Chapin was an American-born actress who was an active suffragette. By the time it was produced at the Court Theatre in November 1911 Chapin was a convicted criminal for her militancy.

In 1910, Collins became a writer for The Occult Review. She issued a statement that she had suffered from eczema for twenty years and also had a nervous breakdown. In 1915, she went to live with her friend Catherine Metcalfe and authored Our Glorious Future. She lived with Metcalfe until her death in 1927.

== Connection to Robert Donston Stephenson ==
Collins and Vittoria Cremers are alleged to have met Robert Donston Stephenson after his release from London Hospital in July 1889 and lived with him in Southsea during 1890. Cremers stated that Collins and herself were the first to suspect that Stephenson was Jack the Ripper. However, such claims have never been verified. Collins preferred to live alone or only with women after the death of her husband in 1886 and Stephenson made no claim of having lived with Collins.

== Selected publications ==
- The Story of Helena Modjeska (Madame Chłapowska) (1883; 2nd edn. 1885)
- Light on the Path (1885)
- The Prettiest Woman in Warsaw (1885)
- Through the Gates of Gold (1887)
- The Blossom and the Fruit (1887)
- The Idyll of the White Lotus (1890)
- Morial the Mahatma (1892)
- Suggestion (1892)
- Juliet’s Lovers (1893)
- The Story of the Year (1895)
- The Star Sapphire (1896)
- A Cry From Afar (1905)
- Loves Chaplet (1905)
- Fragments of Thought and Life (1908)
- Outlawed: A Novel on the Suffrage Question (London: Drame, 1908) with Charlotte Despard.
- One Life, One Law: Thou Shalt Not Kill (London, Theosophical Publishing Society, 1909)
- Outlawed (1909) with Alice Chapin, a play staged in 1911
- When the Sun Moves Northward (1912)
- The Transparent Jewel (1913)
- The Story of Sensa (1913) (a mystery play in three acts adapted from The Idyll of the White Lotus)
- As the Flower Grows (1915)

== See also ==
- Mabel Collins as fiction writer
