= Frank Collins =

Frank Collins may refer to:

- Frank Collins (British Army soldier) (1956–1998), SAS soldier and Church of England minister
- Frank Collins (footballer) (1893–?), Irish footballer
- Frank Collins (ice hockey) (1901–1940), Canadian ice hockey player
- Frank Collins (musician) (born 1947), British composer, singer and arranger
- Frank Collins (Australian cricketer) (1910–2001), Australian cricketer
- Frank Collins (English cricketer) (1903–1988), English cricketer
- Frank Shipley Collins (1848–1920), American botanist and algologist
- Frank Collins (rugby league) (1917–1999), Australian rugby league footballer
- Frank Collins (seaman)

== See also ==
- Francis Collins (disambiguation)
- Frank Collin (born 1944), American political activist
- Frank Collins Emerson (1882–1931), American engineer and politician
