= Frances Collins =

Frances Collins may refer to:

- Frances Collins (writer) (1840–1886), British writer
- Frances Collins (diplomat), Irish diplomat

== See also ==
- Francis Collins (disambiguation)
