= Vittoria Cremers =

Italian Theosophist

Vittoria Cremers (Vittoria Cassini; born c. 1859), was an Italian Theosophist.

== Early years ==
Cremers was born in Pisa, Italy, and was the daughter of Italian Manrico Vittorio Cassini and his British wife, Agnes Elizabeth Rutherford.

== Career ==
Cremers had experience in publishing. After reading the book, Light on the Path, written by Mabel Collins though first anonymously issued in 1885, Cremers felt prompted to immediately join the Theosophical Society. In 1888 she travelled to Britain to meet Madame Blavatsky. As she had been previously involved with publishing, Blavatsky asked her to take over the business side of the Theosophical journal Lucifer. Cremers was soon introduced to Mabel Collins, with whom she became firm friends. According to Jean Overton Fuller, Cremers was close to Aleister Crowley and Victor Neuberg and claimed to know the identity of Jack the Ripper (supposedly Robert D'Onston Stephenson).

== Personal life ==
In Manhattan, New York on November 26, 1886, she married the Russian Baron Louis Cremers, born in 1851 in St. Petersburg, Russia, son of the banker Louis Cremers and his wife, Anna von Struve who separated in 1887.
