= Tim Boyd =

American religious leader

Timothy Breck Boyd (born October 22, 1953) is a theosophist religious leader who was elected the president of the Theosophical Society Adyar in 2014, and to a second seven-year term in 2021. He succeeded Radha Burnier, who had been president of the Theosophical Society Adyar from 1980 until her death in 2013.

== Early life ==
Boyd was born in New York City and lived there for seventeen years until he went away to college at Brown University in Providence, Rhode Island. From Brown University he transferred to the University of Chicago, where he was an honors graduate with a Bachelor of Arts degree in Public Affairs.

== Career ==
On October 5, 1974 he joined the Theosophical Society in America. Together with Bill Lawrence, a TS member, and others he founded a Theosophical spiritual community in Chicago's inner city. The group formed the Royal Associates, a business that initially focused on reclaiming and renovating some of the deteriorating residential buildings in their area. Royal Associates would develop residential buildings for low and middle-income families. The organization’s work helped stabilize neighborhoods through the training and employment of local youth and the creation of affordable homes for area residents.

In 1988 he started as a national lecturer for the TSA. From 1996 to 2000 he worked in hospice services as a volunteer in a team that involved doctors, social workers, and nurses. In 2007 Boyd became president of the Theosophical Order of Service (TOS) USA. In 2014 he was elected president of the Theosophical Society Adyar and he assumed office as their eighth international president at the international Headquarters in Adyar on April 27, 2014.

== Personal life ==
He currently divides his time between the TSA headquarters in Adyar, India and the Olcott Estate in Wheaton, Illinois, where he lives with his wife, Lily, and daughter, Angelique.
