= Olcott Memorial High School =

Secondary school in Tamil Nadu, India

Address
- 2, Besant Avenue, Besant Nagar; Chennai, Tamil Nadu 600090; India
- Coordinates: 13.0039°N 80.2678°E

Information
- Established: 1894
- Founder: Henry Steel Olcott
- Gender: Boys and Girl
- Language: English, Tamil
- Website: oesindia.org

Olcott Memorial High School is a secondary school located in Chennai, Tamil Nadu, India. It is a free school providing free education, school uniforms, educational materials and nutritious meals to about 500 underprivileged boys and girls.

== History ==
The school was started in 1894 by Colonel Olcott with the intention to provide educational upliftment of Paraiyar children. It was the first Paraiyar school in the city. After the demise of Olcott in 1907, the school was renamed as Olcott Memorial Panchama (Paraiyar) School.

The school provides free education, uniforms, books, and two daily meals to lot of impoverished rural children in Chennai. The school is a portion of Theosophical Society Adyar's charity work. From 1935 to 1998, the school was Government aided. From 1999, Theosophical Society took the responsibility again.
