= Golden Link College =

Private college in Caloocan, Philippines

Location
- Waling-waling St., Barangay 177; Caloocan; Philippines
- Coordinates: 14°44′43.7″N 121°3′27.1″E

Information
- Type: Private, Co-educational, Collegiate, Day school
- Established: 2002
- Key people: Vicente Hao Chin, Jr. (President), Rekha Nahar (Administrator)
- Website: theosophy.ph/goldenlinkcollege.html

Golden Link College is an institution established by the Theosophical Society in the Philippines and the Theosophical Order of Service Foundation Philippines. It is located in the northern part of Caloocan, Philippines. As of 2009, it offers courses from preschool, elementary, secondary up to collegiate levels. It is a non-profit, non-sectarian college set up as foundation.

== History ==
The Golden Link College was established in 2002 as Golden Link School at the request of community members in Camarin, Caloocan, where the Theosophical Order of Service had established a pre-school called TOS Learning Center. It opened in June 2002 with pre-school classes (nursery, kindergarten, and preparatory levels). The following year, it accepted elementary school pupils. In 2005, it opened its secondary school department. In 2006, its started its Golden Link Institute for Teacher Training as a program for training its own teachers and college students who are taking up education courses. In 2009, it was given approval by the Commission on Higher Education (CHED) to open two collegiate courses: Bachelor of Secondary Education (major in English, Mathematics or Physical Sciences) and Bachelor of Elementary Education (major in General Education or Preschool Education). It added three additional courses: Bachelor of Science in Information Technology, Bachelor of Science in Business Administration (major in Marketing Management), and Bachelor of Science in Psychology. In 2013, it was given approval by CHED to offer Teacher Certificate Program (TCP) for college graduates of non-education courses so that they can take the government Licensure Examination for Teachers.

Golden Link College frequently has visiting teachers or professors from other countries (e.g., Australia, France, Switzerland) who teach short-term courses in various fields, such as leadership, literature, leadership, art, etc. It has also received grants and support from individuals and organizations for scholarships to poor students and for campus development.

The school is located in Waling-Waling Street, Barangay 177, Caloocan, Philippines.

While the school is private and has tuition fees, it is open to those families who cannot afford to pay regular tuition fees. Most of its students are under various forms of scholarship. Every year, it offers free summer classes to the community focusing on language proficiency and personality development.

== Bohol Branch ==
In 2013, Golden Link College opened its first branch in Cortes, Bohol Province, for preschool levels: Nursery, Kindergarten 1 and Kindergarten 2. Like its mother campus, it also offered free summer classes to the community for the development of language proficiency and personality. In 2015, it opened its elementary department.
