= Mortimer Collins =

English poet and novelist (1827–1876)

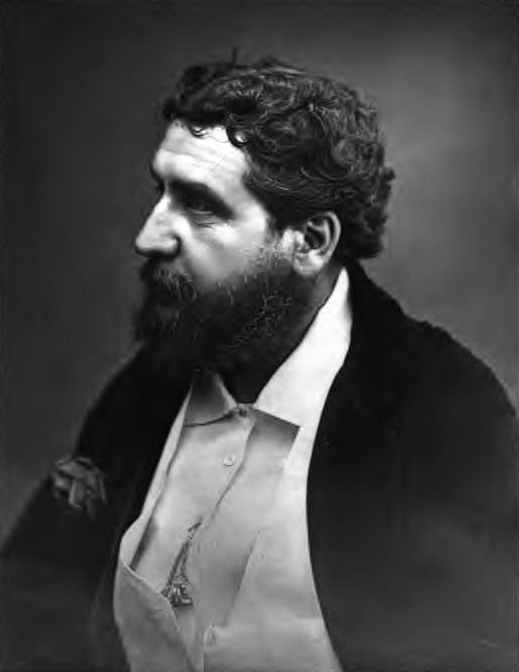
- Born: 29 June 1827; Plymouth
- Died: 28 July 1876 (aged 49); Richmond, Surrey

Signature
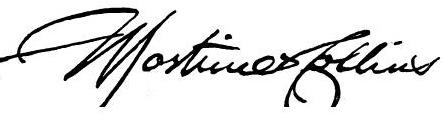

Edward James Mortimer Collins (29 June 1827 – 28 July 1876) was an English novelist, journalist and poet. Some of his lyrics, with their "light grace, their sparkling wit and their airy philosophy", were described in the 1911 Encyclopædia Britannica as "equal to anything of their kind in modern English".

== Biography ==
He was born at Plymouth, son of Francis Collins, a solicitor there, and his wife Maud Branscombe. On 13 November 1834, he was baptized at the Ebenezer Independent Chapel, in Kingsbridge, Devon, when his date of birth in 1827 was also noted. He was educated at a private school in Westbury, Wiltshire, and after some years spent as mathematics master at Elizabeth College, Guernsey, he relocated to London. Collins devoted himself to journalism written from the Conservative Party perspective, mainly for periodicals. He also wrote occasional and humorous verse, and several novels. Soon after his second marriage, to Frances Dunn in 1868, he settled at Knowl Hill, Berkshire, and from this time he rarely left his home for a day and published several novels.

Collins died at Nightingale Hall, Richmond Hill, aged only 49, while visiting his son-in-law, Keningale Robert Cook, husband of his daughter Mabel Collins. His funeral was attended by many literary friends, including Tom Taylor, the editor of Punch, the novelist R. D. Blackmore, and the poets Frederick Locker and R H Horne, Percival Leigh, E. Owens Blackburne, Henry Sutherland Edwards, James and Montague Vizetelly. He was buried in St Peter's Church, Petersham; there is no memorial stone.

== Writings ==
In 1855, he published his Idyls and Rhymes; and in 1865 his first story, Who is the Heir? was published. A second volume of lyrics, The Inn of Strange Meetings, was issued in 1871; and in 1872 he produced his longest and best sustained poem, The British Birds, a communication from the Ghost of Aristophanes.

He also wrote several novels, including Sweet Anne Page (1868), Two Plunges for a Pearl (1872), Miranda (1873), Mr. Carrington (1873, under the name of R. T. Cotton), Squire Silchester's Whim (1873, set in Devon), Sweet and Twenty (1875), and A Fight with Fortune (1876). His three-volume novel Transmigration (1873) is "a fantasy of multiple incarnations of which the middle one is set on a utopian Mars." Selections from the Poetical Works of Mortimer Collins made by F. Percy Cotton was published in 1886.

Collins is credited by the New English Dictionary with introducing psithurism to the English language. Derived from the Ancient Greek for "whisper", it was applied specifically to the whispering of the wind. This was observed (inaccurately) by The Guardian newspaper in an editorial of 30 September 1909, reprinted on 30 September 2006 but not available online.
