= Dora Kunz =

American writer (1904–1999)

Dora Kunz née Theodora Sophia van Gelder (April 28, 1904 – August 25, 1999) was a Dutch-American writer, psychic, alternative healer, occultist and leader in the Theosophical Society in America. Kunz's works have been widely published in Dutch, English, French, German, Polish, Portuguese, and Spanish.

== Biography ==
Dora van Gelder was born at a sugar cane plantation named Krebet near Djombang city on East Java in the Dutch East Indies. Her father, Karel van Gelder, was a chemist who ran the sugar plantation, and her mother, born Melanie van Motman, was from a very well-to-do Dutch family as well. Both her parents had been members of the Theosophical Society since 1900 and from the age of 5 meditation became a daily routine. Dora claimed that since she was a child she interacted with ethereal beings and her mother was a strong believer in her clairvoyance. At eleven years old she moved to Mosman, a suburb of Sydney (Australia), to study with someone knowledgeable about her abilities, the then-Anglican clergyman and psychic C. W. Leadbeater, who taught her ways to increase her psychic skills.

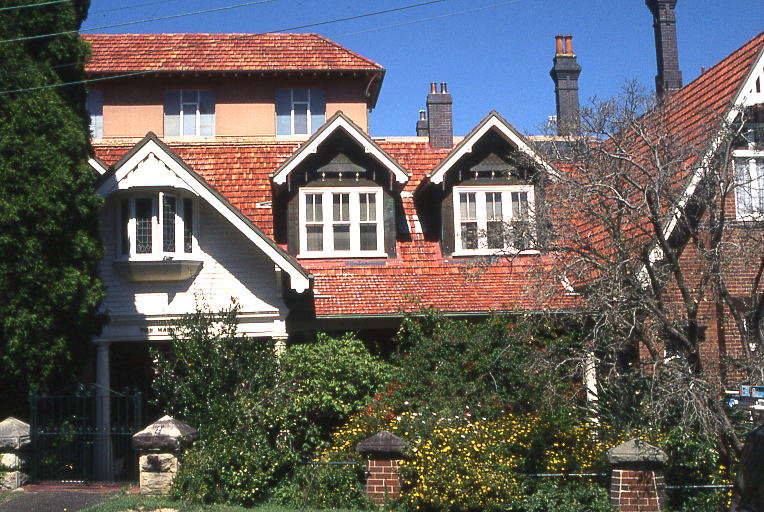
The Manor, a training center rented by Theosophical Society in Mosman, Sydney where Dora Kunz stayed for a while.

Through Leadbeater she met Fritz Kunz, who used to accompany Leadbeater on his travels. Fritz for a time was principal of Ananda College in Colombo. In 1927, at the age of twenty-two, Dora moved with Kunz to the United States where they married in Chicago on May 16. She was still a Dutch citizen but sometime after the marriage became a naturalized American. Her husband became the principal of a scholastic foundation and she became president of a corporation related to pedagogic supplies. Soon after coming to the USA, the couple founded the first theosophical camp at Orcas Island in the state of Washington.

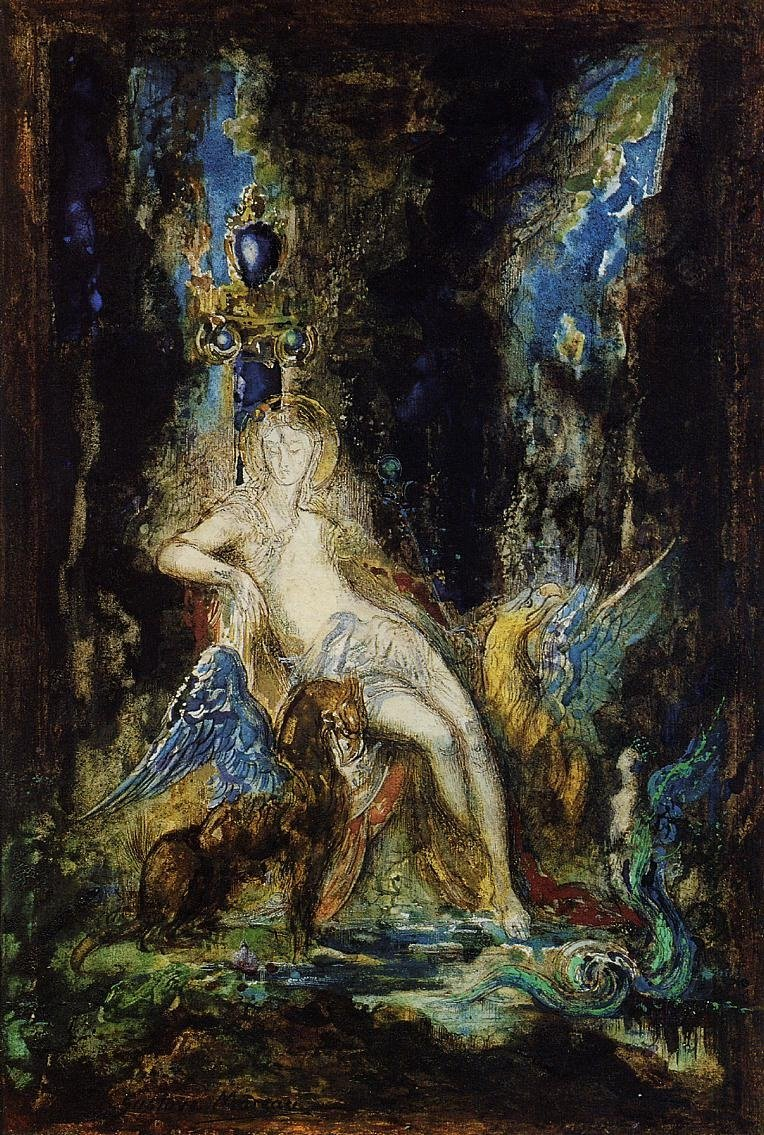
According to Dora van Gelder there exist powerful beings called Devas which transmit and direct energy to the nature. "Fairy and Griffon" by Gustave Moreau, 19th century.

For many years, Dora dealt with new methods in healing, particularly therapeutic touch, which she co-developed in 1972 with Dr. Dolores Krieger, a nursing professor at New York University, which is said to promote healing, relaxation and lessen pain. Therapeutic touch, stated Kunz, has its origin from ancient Yogic texts written in Sanskrit, which describe it as a pranic healing method. The technique is taught in approximately eighty colleges and universities in the U.S., and in more than seventy countries.

Kunz philanthropically directed her clairvoyance towards helping physicians in complicated medical cases, in particular aiding in diagnoses through her capability of seeing the effects of diseases in the aura of the patients. More specifically she reported the existence of centers of energy in human body, also known as chakras, changing their colors according to diseases that affect matching endocrine glands. Her followers believed she was able to predict some illness as many as eighteen months before symptoms manifest themselves.

In 1975 Kunz became president of the Theosophical Society in America. In 1977 she published a book about her fairy experiences in her youth, "The Real World of Fairies", in which she stated that throughout her life she always kept in communication with nature spirits. According to her, in 1979 she saw fairies in Central Park in New York City, but due to the increasing pollution it was getting more difficult. Kunz claims that devas are intimately connected with a vital energy, transmitting force to preserve and heal the Earth. She said as more people get involved with environmental causes, the better are the chances of communication between humans and devas. In 1987 after completing twelve years as president of the Theosophical Society in America, she retired and devoted herself to lecturing and writing.

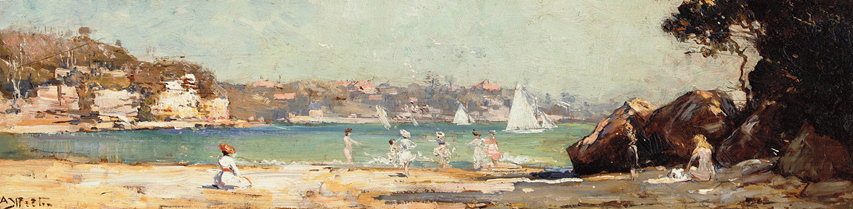
In the 1920s walking on the shores of Mosman Dora Kunz says she met a friendly nature spirit worried about evil entities who had invaded the local area, and she managed to expel them. "Mosman's Bay" by Arthur Streeton, 1914.

== Criticism ==
The healing method, the "Therapeutic Touch" conceived by Dolores Krieger and Dora Kunz in the early 1970s using the "human energy field" was tested in 1996 by Emily Rosa. At age nine Rosa conceived and executed a scientific study of therapeutic touch which was published in the Journal of the American Medical Association in 1998. It was a critique of all of the studies related to TT she could locate in nursing journals and elsewhere. This made Rosa the youngest person to have a research paper published in a peer-reviewed medical journal. She concluded as her opinion:
"The more rigorous the research design, the more detailed the statistical analysis, the less evidence that there is any observed—or observable—phenomenon." She just could not see it.

== Works ==
=== Books ===
- Christmas of the Angels, 1962.
- The Real World of Fairies, 1977.
- Fields and their clinical implications; co-author Erik Peper, 1985.
- Spiritual aspects of the healing arts, 1985.
- Devic Counsciouness, 1989.
- The Chakras and the Human Energy Fields; co-author Shafica Karagulla, 1989.
- The Personal Aura, 1991.
- Spiritual Healing, 1995.
- Aura en persoonlijkheid: aura's zien en begrijpen (Aura and personality: see auras and understand); co-author George Hulskramer, 1998.

=== Interviews and lectures ===
- Personal Reminiscences of Annie Besant and Charles W. Leadbeater with Fritz and Dora Kunz; (Theosophical Audio Library 71 mins.)1967.
- Healing and the Dynamic Structure of Man, 1974.
- Masters and the Future of the Theosophical Society, 1978.
- The Alchemical Power of Consciousness Healing; with Janet Macrae, 1979.
- The Path and the Spiritual Life; with Renee Weber, 1980.
- Application of Theosophy; with William J. Ross, 1981.
- Use of Healing Energy in Therapeutic Touch, 1981.
- Karma and Human Relations, 1981.
- Masters of the Wisdom, 1982.
- Inner Structure of Man & Its Effects On Life, 1983.
- Interview with Father Bede Griffiths, 1983.
- Depression From the Energetic Perspective; with Erik Peper, 1984.
- Masters and the Future, 1984.
- Man's Experience at Different Levels of Consciousness, 1985.
- Theosophical Perspectives on Dealing with Pain; with Erik Peper, 1985.
- The Objectives of the Theosophical Society; with Radha Burnier, 1986.
- The Role of Karma in Life, 1986.
- Letting Go: Perspectives on Death and Dying; with Erik Peper, 1987.
- Chakras and the Human Energy Fields, 1989.
- Deeper View of Healing and Its Many Aspects; with Dolores Krieger, 1989.
- Conscious Use of the Healing Mind; with Dolores Krieger, 1990.
- Healing and Changes in the Invisible Emotional Patterns, 1991.
- Conversation with Dora Kunz, 1992.
- Personal Aura and its Relation to Daily Life, 1992.
- Karma: White Lotus Day Commemoration, 1994.
- Spiritual Aspects of Healing and Therapeutic Touch, 1994.
- Meditation as a Part of Life, 1996.

== See also ==
- Reiki
- van Gelder Kunz Dora van Gelder Kunz (Theosophy Wiki)
