= Edmonton Theosophical Society =

Independent theosophical society in Canada

The Edmonton Theosophical Society is an independent theosophical society in Canada. It was founded in 1911, was from 1919 to 1992 part of the Canadian Section of the Theosophical Society Adyar and since 1995 it is independent of the Theosophical Society in Canada.

== History ==
The first theosophical lodge in Canada was founded on February 16, 1891 in Toronto by Albert E. S. Smythe, Emily Stowe, Augusta Stowe-Gullen and Algernon Blackwood. In 1895, the society was divided into two different parts, one adhering to the Theosophical Society Adyar, the other (the majority) to the Theosophical Society in America. Until 1919 many lodges formed part of the Theosophical Society in America. Following the initiative of Albert Smythe, the Theosophical Society in Canada was formed, and consisted of 17 lodges with approximately 800 members. Smythe also came in conflict with Annie Besant, and in 1924 she helped to found the Canadian Federation of the Theosophical Society. Therefore, there were in 1924 two Theosophical Societies that were part of the Theosophical Society Adyar.

In 1992, the Theosophical Society in Canada became independent. In 1995 there was a divide in the Theosophical Society of Canada. The lodges in Edmonton and Calgary separated from the TS in Canada and formed the independent Edmonton Theosophical Society. The Canadian Federation changed its name later to the Canadian Theosophical Association.

The Edmonton Theosophical Society was founded in 1911, in 1919 it became part of the Canadian Section of the Theosophical Society Adyar, in 1992 they separated from the TS Adyar and in 1995 they became independent. Since 1997 they publish the Fohat magazine and have a publishing house and a book store.
