= Adyar Library =

Library

Coordinates: 13°0′39.14″N 80°15′45.65″E

The Adyar Library and Research Centre was founded in 1886 by Theosophist Henry Steel Olcott. The library is at the Theosophical Society Adyar in Adyar, near Chennai, India.

== History ==
Henry Steel Olcott founded the "Library Olcott" in December 1886. Olcott's small private collection of approximately 200 books in 24 languages were the core of the library. During his travels in Asia, Olcott acquired more, often rare, books for the library. After Olcott's death in 1907, the library was continued by other Theosophists. Today, the library has approximately 250,000 books and 20,000 palm leaves. The library is today among the most important Orientalist libraries in the world.

The library was at first situated inside the headquarters of the Theosophical Society. In 1966, it was moved to a separate building, the Adyar Library Building. It also has a public museum that shows old books and manuscripts. The Adyar Library is also used by post-graduate students in Sanskrit and Indology of the University of Madras.

In 1990, a bequest by the Australian philanthropist Elliston Campbell (1891 – 1990) further funded the Adyar Library and founded the Campbell Theosophical Research Library, in Sydney, Australia.

The University of Chicago is trying to preserve the old works in the Adyar Library with modern techniques.

== Conservation Efforts ==
The Adyar Library And Research Center started scanning its manuscripts in 2015. It has a dedicated team for scanning and preservation of manuscripts.

In 2025, the library also launched its website and online public catalogue to help researchers and students.
