= John Coats =

British Theosophist leader

John B. S. Coats or JBS Coats (8 July 1906 in Ayr, South Ayrshire, Scotland – 26 December 1979) was a theosophist, president of the Theosophical Society Adyar and bishop of the Liberal Catholic Church.

Coats and his wife, Elizabeth Ann 'Betsan' Coats (nee Horlick), were both members of Lodge Light of Amen-Ra, no. 717 of the British Federation of what is now the International Order of Freemasonry for Men and Women, LE DROIT HUMAIN. They were also both founding members of Lodge International Concord, no, 977.

In 1932 he became a member of the T.S. in London. There he met Alice Bailey, C. Jinarajadasa, Rukmini Devi Arundale and George Arundale. In 1973 he became president of the T.S. Adyar.
