= Robert Donston Stephenson =

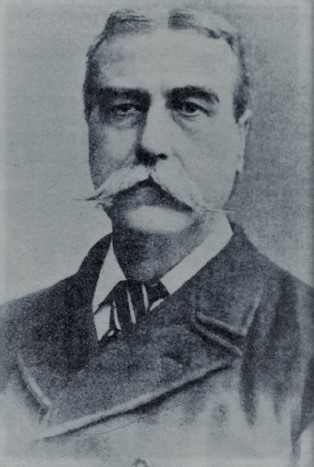
- Stephenson c. 1900
- Born: 20 April 1841; Sculcoates, Hull, Yorkshire, England
- Died: 9 October 1916 (aged 75)
- Other names: Roslyn D'Onston
- Occupations: writer, journalist

Robert Donston Stephenson (also known as Roslyn D'Onston) (20 April 1841 – 9 October 1916) was a British writer and journalist, chiefly known for having been made a potential suspect in the Jack the Ripper investigation and for his personal theory as to the identity of the murderer.

== Involvement ==
Mary Ann Nichols, the first victim generally acknowledged to have been killed by 'Jack the Ripper', was found about 150 yards from the London Hospital, on 31 August 1888. Stephenson had been staying at the hospital since 26 July and left on 7 December.

His profession, and his private studies of the 'occult sciences', made him take a more than average interest in the evolving murder series. At the London Hospital the murders were, as elsewhere, the major subject of conversation.

After witnessing one Doctor Morgan Davies performing a demonstration of how the murderer may have been subduing and killing the victims, Stephenson found Davies' behaviour suspicious, and brought the story to George Marsh, an ironmongery salesman professing to be an amateur detective.

George Marsh, on his side, found Stephenson to be the more suspicious character, and went to the Scotland Yard. One of the officers, Inspector Roots, immediately recognized the suspect by description as being a man he had known for 20 years – Robert Donston Stephenson: "a travelled man of education and ability, a doctor of medicine upon diplomas of Paris and New York: a major from the Italian Army – he fought under Garibaldi: and a newspaper writer".

From Roots's report it may seem that Stephenson was cleared of suspicion without further ado. According to Maxim Jakubowski and Jonathan Braund "it appears that his (Stephenson's) cultured manner and eagerness to assist the police with arcane knowledge evoked their admiration rather than their suspicion".

Stephenson's interest in the crimes eventually led to an article in the Pall Mall Gazette, presenting his own theory about the motivation and identity of the murderer, based upon the character of the crimes and a possible clue found in Goulston Street. According to Stephenson the murderer would have to be a practician of "black magic" as the parts removed from the victims bodies could be used for ritual purposes.

Stephenson's theory also referred to a possible clue found in Goulston Street where, after the murder of Catherine Eddowes on 30 September, in Mitre Square, a piece of her bloodied apron was left under a sentence neatly written in chalk, at the entrance of a 'model dwelling' with Jewish tenants. A written copy was taken down, registering the writing as saying: "The Juwes are the men that Will not be Blamed for nothing".

Two weeks later, on 17 October, after noticing that the Chief Commissioner of the Metropolitan Police, Sir Charles Warren, had been claiming that "no language or dialogue is known in which the word Jews is spelled JUWES", Stephenson wrote a letter to the City Police, claiming that a similar word did indeed exist.

== Suspected ==
Stephenson later fell under the suspicion of newspaper editor William Thomas Stead, the writer Mabel Collins and her friend Baroness Vittoria Cremers. Cremers told Aleister Crowley that Stephenson was a doctor and had committed the Whitechapel murders as part of a magic ritual and that the sites of the murders, when joined on a map, formed a calvary cross (which is untrue). The suspicion was not merely caused by Stephenson's preoccupation with "black magic". He had been, by his own account, in love with a prostitute, and had contracted venereal disease from others. The fact that Stephenson's wife seemingly disappeared in 1886 has led to the otherwise unsupported speculation that he may have killed her. According to Jakubowski and Braund, Stephenson claimed to have killed others, and that he was keeping ties stained with human blood, as well as being the owner of candles made from human fat. Collins and Cremers' theory was later resurrected by Richard Whittington-Egan in A Casebook on Jack the Ripper and subsequently developed by the author Melvin Harris in Jack the Ripper: The Bloody Truth and its two sequels. Crime writer Colin Wilson praised the research done by Harris but concluded it didn't prove any connection between Stephenson and Jack the Ripper. Jakubowski and Braund state that the major problem with Stephenson as a suspect is that the idea is heavily reliant on his own testimony, both as to "the depth of his heartlessness and iniquity and as to his activities". Whilst Cremers, the principal witness, was closely linked to Aleister Crowley and Stephenson's "air of mystery and his somewhat theatrical, throwaway boast of wickedness" seem to anticipate Crowley's own romancing, the statements about blood and candles may have been theatrical props specifically designed to have the effect which they had – to frighten two impressionable women. Author Ivor Edwards also named Stephenson as the Ripper in his book Jack the Ripper's Black Magic Rituals published by Penny Publishing (2001) and Blake Publishing (2002).

=== Dismissal ===
In 2007, British researcher Mike Covell received the hospital protocol from London Hospital Museum Curator Jonathan Evans that patients in the Currie & Davis Wards of the London Hospital, where Stephenson had been since July 1888, were unable to leave the premises at the time the murders occurred in the East End. Hospital protocol prevented non-patients from entering the Wards at night.

Author Michael Newton dismissed Stephenson as a suspect, commenting he had "no evident link to the crimes".

In 2011, Researcher Spiro Dimolianis noted that London Hospital night-shift rosters and practices indicate that Stephenson was not able to leave on the nights of the murders and hence could not have been Jack the Ripper. For example, Dimolianis has written:

With the close time frame of the discovery of the body of Annie Chapman, noted in witness and medical inquest testimony for her murder on 8 September 1888 around daybreak, it would have been impossible for Stephenson to comply with this London rule breakfast at 6 A.M. without alerting staff if he was the killer. As the murder and mutilation of Chapman is a confirmed Jack the Ripper crime, this fact alone discounts and eliminates Stephenson of suspicion for the Whitechapel murders.
