= Francis Collins (disambiguation) =

Francis Collins (born 1950) is an American physician-geneticist.

Francis Collins may also refer to:

- Francis D. Collins (1841–1891), American politician
- Francis Collins (Borris–Ileigh hurler) on Borris–Ileigh Hurling Team 1987
- Francis Collins (hurler), Irish hurler

== See also ==
- Frank Collins (disambiguation)
- Frances Collins (disambiguation)
- Francis Collings, BBC journalist
- Francis Collin (born 1987), English footballer
