= Keningale Robert Cook =

British author and poet

Keningale Robert Cook (1845-1886) was a writer and poet.

== Early life ==
He was born in Smallbridge, Rochdale, Lancashire on 26 September 1845, the son of Robert Keningale Cook (1812-1891) and Ellen Cook (née Nield, 1823-1909). His father was vicar at St John the Baptist's Church and Cook was baptised there. He was educated at Rugby School and Trinity College Dublin, where he was awarded LL.D in 1875. He was editor of the Dublin University Magazine.

== Career ==
He was a stockbroker at the London Stock Exchange, an author and poet; he was associated with the Vegetarian Society.

His poems Purpose and Passion: Pygmalion and Other Poems published in 1870 were reviewed by W M Rossetti who wrote "It has an ardour, an aspiration both poetic and intellectual, a susceptibility, a sense of splendour, and an aim towards art, which cannot be either ignored or made light of."

Cook went on to write The Guitar Player (1881), The king of Kent [a drama in verse] (1882) and Love in a mist, a romance (1886).

== Personal life ==
He married Mabel Collins, the daughter of Mortimer Collins, on 3 August 1871 in St Peter's Church, Knowl Hill, Berkshire. Collins died at Nightingale Hall, Richmond, while visiting Keningale Cook in 1876.

In 1881 they were living at 60 Bedford Gardens, Kensington. He died on 24 June 1886 at Arnewood Rise, Hordle, Hampshire, in the New Forest and was buried at All Saints' Church, Hordle.

He is listed on the Dante Gabriel Rossetti Memorial fountain, Chelsea Embankment.

== Publications ==
- Purpose and Passion: Pygmalion and Other Poems (1870)
- The Guitar Player (1881)
- The king of Kent [a drama in verse] (1882)
- The Fathers of Jesus. A Study of the Lineage of the Christian Doctrine and Traditions (1886)
- Love in a mist, a romance (1886)
