= Olcott Estate =

Coordinates: 41.885494°N 88.106937°W

- Theosophical Society in America Headquarters
- U.S. National Register of Historic Places
- Location within Illinois
- Location: 1926 North Main Street, Wheaton, Illinois
- Area: 10 acres (4.0 ha)
- NRHP reference No.: 100011694
- Added to NRHP: April 15, 2025

Olcott Estate is the administrative headquarters of the Theosophical Society in America. Its education department conducts on-site courses, seminars, workshops, and lectures for members and the public. The estate, located in Wheaton, Illinois, has landscaping and architecture on Theosophical themes, and is listed on the National Register of Historic Places.

== History ==
For the first fifty years of its history, the Society had its headquarters in various locations, according to the residence of its national presidents. In the mid-1920s, while L. W. Rogers was president of the American Section, the Wheaton site was selected. The property was purchased and continues to be maintained through the dues and gifts of members. In 1926 the cornerstone of the main building was laid by Annie Besant, second international President of the Society. This building was first occupied in 1927, and since that time has continued as the center of Theosophical work in the United States.

Olcott Estate derives its name from original society president, Colonel Henry Steel Olcott, who formed the society in 1875. During the society's annual convention of 1932, members celebrated the centenary of Colonel Olcott's birth by naming the headquarters campus after him. President Sidney A. Cook referred to the estate as "Olcott" in his annual report. For many years postal mail was delivered to "Olcott, Wheaton, Illinois."

== Theosophical Society use ==
The main structure at Olcott is called the L. W. Rogers Building in honor of the national president in whose administration it was constructed. It looks out over a wide sweep of lawn toward the Main Street entrance gate, which has welcomed members and visitors since 1940. Designed by the eminent American architect, writer, and Theosophist Claude Fayette Bragdon, the gate's pillars are capped by two of the five Platonic solids, symbolizing the order inherent in the universe. Many events held by the Society are held at Olcott Mansion, and the publishers of Quest magazine have their main offices at Olcott Mansion as well.

== Education use ==
Olcott provides a summer school for members in conjunction with the Society’s Annual Meeting, usually in July, at which prominent Theosophical students gather to learn from one another. A number of these programs have been recorded and are posted online for free listening. The Theosophical Society Department of Education also provides online courses as well as traditional correspondence courses. The L. W. Rogers Building houses the Henry S. Olcott Memorial Library, which contains more than 18,000 titles of books, periodicals, and audio and video cassettes. The library is popular with students and inquirers who come to browse or to borrow from its extensive collection of philosophical and religious literature, rare books and archives.

== Location ==
Olcott is located in Wheaton, IL, near the Billy Graham Center, a major Evangelical Christian organization and Cantigny Park. Many local college students utilize the Olcott Library, including students from nearby Wheaton College, DePaul University, North Central College, and the College of DuPage.
