= Frank Collins (Australian cricketer) =

Australian cricketer

Personal information
- Born: 16 December 1910; Queenstown, South Australia
- Died: 25 January 2001 (aged 90); Penola, South Australia
- Source: Cricinfo, 4 June 2018

Frank Collins (16 December 1910 – 25 January 2001) was an Australian cricketer. He played fifteen first-class matches for South Australia between 1934 and 1936.

== See also ==
- List of South Australian representative cricketers
