= Frank Collins (ice hockey) =

Canadian ice hockey player

- Born: September 28, 1901 Hastings, Ontario, Canada
- Died: November 9, 1940 (aged 39) Belleville, Ontario, Canada
- Position: Right wing
- Played for: Toronto National Sea Fleas
- National team: Canada
- Playing career: 1932–1933

Francis Alphonso Collins (September 28, 1901 – November 9, 1940) was a Canadian ice hockey player.

Collins won a silver medal with the Canada Men's National Ice Hockey Team, coached by Harold Ballard, at the 1933 World Ice Hockey Championships held in Prague, Czechoslovakia.
