= Frances Collins (writer) =

British writer

Frances Dunn Collins
- Born: 14 July 1840; London, England, U.K
- Died: 17 March 1886 (aged 45)
- Occupation: Writer
- Partner: Mortimer Collins
- Writing career
- Language: English

Frances Collins (née Dunn; 14 July 1840 – Camberley, Surrey, 17 March 1886) was a British writer and the wife of Mortimer Collins.

== Biography ==
Frances Dunn was born in 1840. She married the writer Mortimer Collins in 1868. Mortimer Collins was ill and struggling financially when the couple married, and Frances helped him to manage his finances and co-wrote his last few books with him. Following her husband's death in 1876, Frances Collins published several novels under her own name as well as a memoir of her husband. She also wrote several short pieces for periodicals such as Punch.

== Publications ==
- (with Mortimer Collins) A Fight With Fortune (1876)
- Mortimer Collins: His Letters and Friendships (1877)
- (with Mortimer Collins) You Play Me False (1878)
- A Broken Lily (1882)
- The Village Comedy (1883)
