= Nilakanta Sri Ram =

N. Sriram
- Born: Neelakanta Sri Ram; 15 December 1889; Thanjavur, Tamilnadu
- Died: 8 April 1973 (aged 83); Chennai, Tamilnadu
- Occupation: freemason
- Children: Radha Burnier

Nilakanta Sri Ram or Nilakantha Sri Ram (N. Sri Ram) (* 15 December 1889 in Thanjavur, Tamil Nadu, India; died 8 April 1973 in Adyar, India) was a freemason, theosophist and president of the Theosophical Society Adyar during twenty years.

== Biography ==
In his early years, Sri Ram worked under Annie Besant in various capacities. Sri Ram was a teacher at the Besant Theosophical College in Madanapalle, the National School in Bangalore and the National University of India in Chennai.

The twenty years of Sri Ram’s Presidency represented an important change in the work of the Theosophical Society, as well as in the perception its members had of the nature of Theosophy. His achievement represented a shift from an emphasis on the occult side of things and its related phenomena, to the focus on the ethics of Theosophy, or true occultism, and its role in the transformation of the human consciousness. N. Sri Ram was the last President of the TS to have had contact with the President-Founder, Col. Olcott. He represented a link with the very origins of the Society and its work, not only historically but above all spiritually.

Sri Ram's daughter Radha Burnier was the seventh president of the Theosophical Society Adyar, from 1980 until 2013.

He became president of the TS Adyar in 1953 and stayed in that office till his death in 1973. He was also member of Le Droit Humain.

== Works (selection) ==
- An approach to reality. Theosophical Publishing House, Madras 1968
- On the watch tower, selected editorial notes from The Theosophist, 1953-1966. Theosophical Publishing House, Madras 1966
- The human interest and other addresses and short essays. Theosophical Publishing House, Wheaton 1968
- A Theosophist Looks at the World Adyar, Chennai, India: Theosophical Publishing House, 1950.
- An Approach to Reality and Man. Adyar, Chennai, India: Theosophical Publishing House, 1951.
- Man, His Origins and Evolution, Adyar, Chennai, India: Theosophical Publishing House, 1952.
- Thoughts for Aspirants, Adyar, Chennai, India: Theosophical Publishing House, 1957.
- On the Watch Tower, Selected Editorial Notes from "The Theosophist, 1953-1966". Adyar, Chennai, India: Theosophical Publishing House, 1966. A compilation of his articles.
- The Human Interest and Other Addresses and Short Essays. Adyar, Chennai, India: Theosophical Publishing House, 1968, and previous edition published around 1951.
- Life's Deeper Aspect, Adyar, Chennai, India: Theosophical Publishing House, 1968.
- Seeking Wisdom Adyar, Chennai, India: Theosophical Pub. House, 1969.
- The Nature of Our Seeking, 1973.
- The Way of Wisdom, Adyar, Chennai, India: Theosophical Publishing House, 1989.
