= Theosophical Society Adyar =

International occult organisation

Coordinates: 13.01016°N 80.27028°E

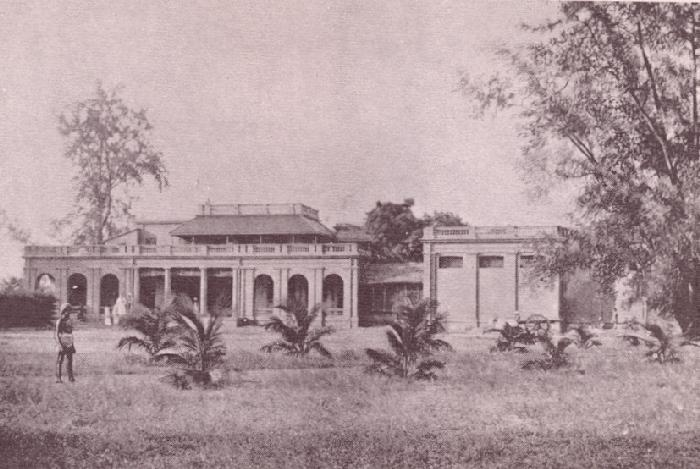
Theosophical Society International Headquarters, Adyar, India, in 1890

The Theosophical Society was founded by Helena Petrovna Blavatsky and others in 1875. The designation 'Adyar' is sometimes added to the name to make it clear that this is the Theosophical Society headquartered there, after the American section and some other lodges separated from it in 1895, under William Quan Judge. In 1882, its headquarters moved with Blavatsky and president Henry Steel Olcott from New York to Adyar, an area of Chennai, India.

The US National Section of this organization is called the Theosophical Society in America, located in Wheaton, Illinois.

== Founders ==
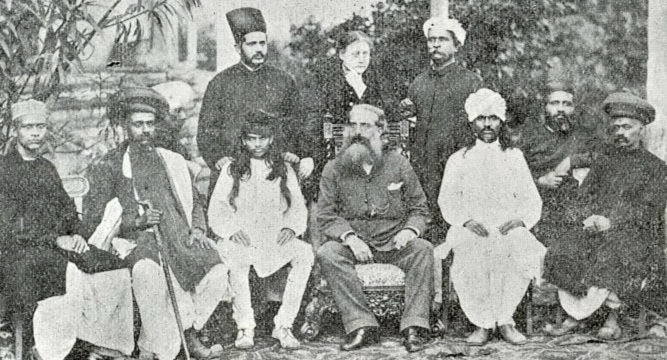
H. P. Blavatsky (Helena Petrovna Blavatsky) standing behind Henry Steel Olcott (middle, seated) and Damodar Mavalankar (seated to his left). Bombay, 1881

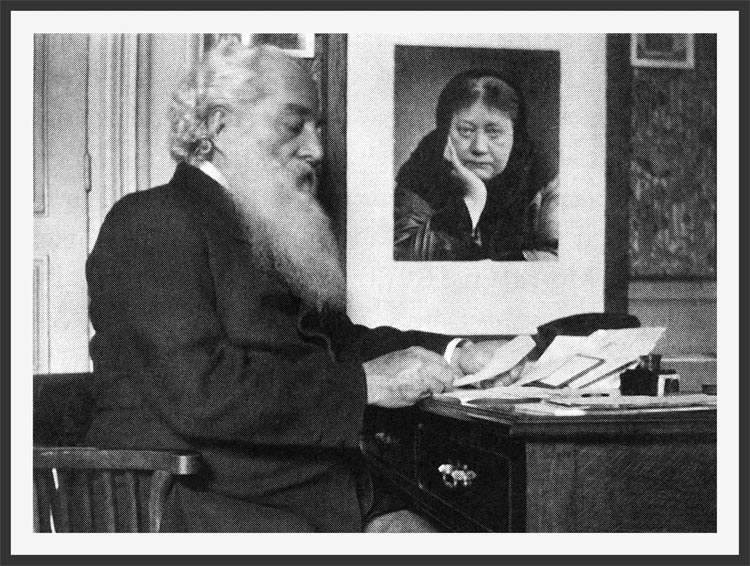
Colonel Olcott in Adyar, 1903

H. P. Blavatsky (Helena Petrovna Blavatsky), Henry Steel Olcott, William Quan Judge and others founded the Theosophical Society on 17 November 1875 in New York City. The American section split off with William Quan Judge as its leader. Henry Steel Olcott remained president until his death in 1907.

== Aims and ideals ==
1. To form a nucleus of the Universal Brotherhood of Humanity, without distinction of race, creed, sex, caste or color.
2. To encourage the study of Comparative Religion, Philosophy and Science.
3. To investigate unexplained laws of Nature and the powers latent in man.

=== Monastic/non-monastic ===
The Theosophical Society is open to anybody who supports its three objectives, regardless of belief, social custom or marriage status. Celibacy is neither encouraged nor discouraged, each member being free to decide his/her own way of life.

=== Spiritual discipline ===
The practice of brotherhood regardless of race, creed, sex, color, or any other difference is recommended. Nothing is mandatory. Members are free to have any or no spiritual practice at all.

=== Administration ===
The organization has a highly autonomous setup in that lodges and sections are fully autonomous. The President gets involved in National Section matters only when there is some dispute between them. Otherwise the President does not interfere in the matters of the sections or lodges. The President is nominated by the members of the General Council and then elected by members all over the world. The President holds office for seven-year period. The Vice-President acts on behalf of the President as necessary and assists him or her in various ways. The Secretary handles worldwide correspondence; maintains records including statistics of the worldwide membership of the Society, its Lodges and Sections; is responsible for producing an annual report; and is also the Secretary of the General Council and the Executive Committee of the Society. This Committee, which meets a number of times each year, implements the decisions of the General Council and makes financial and administrative decisions relating to the Society's Headquarters. The Treasurer is responsible for the finances of the Society and prepares an annual financial report.

Locally, members are organised in lodges. When a country has at least seven lodges, these can be gathered in a national section. Lodges and sections have a democratic organisation in which chairperson, secretary, treasurer and optional other officers are elected. Similarly, officers of the national sections are directly elected by the members of that section in a business meeting.

== International presidents ==
1. Henry Steel Olcott (1875 to 1907).
2. Annie Besant (1907 to 1933).
3. George Arundale (1934 to 1945).
4. Curuppumullage Jinarajadasa (1946 to 1953).
5. Nilakanta Sri Ram (1953 to 1972).
6. John Coats (1972 to 1980).
7. Radha Burnier (1980 to 2013).
8. Tim Boyd (2014 to ...)

== Activities ==
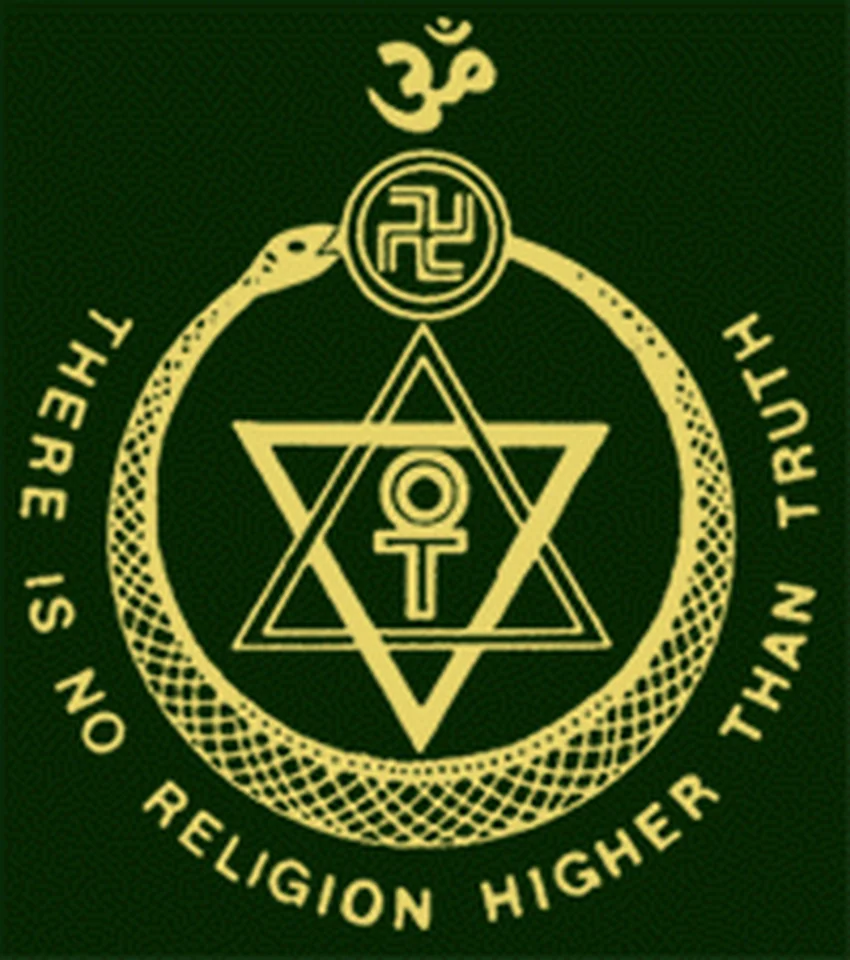
Emblem of Theosophical Society Adyar

=== Religion and spirituality ===
The Theosophical Society is organised in lodges and national sections. These organise meetings for religious study and lectures. Members individually practice any kind of meditation or other spiritual practice they choose.

=== Social field ===
- The Olcott Education Society
- The Olcott Memorial School
- The Olcott Memorial High School
- The Theosophical Order of Service

Olcott Memorial High School provides free education, uniforms, books, and two daily meals to impoverished rural children in Chennai, Tamil Nadu, India.

=== Cultural field ===
- Theosophical Publishing House

=== Besant Scout Camping Centre ===
Dr. Arundale, Provincial Scout Commissioner and President of Theosophical Society after Dr. Besant, set aside 10 acres of wooded area in the Olcott Gardens (part of TS) and named it Besant Scout Camping Centre (BSCC) in memory of the founder. Young Scouts and Guides frequent this on weekend for camping for various skill development and competitions amongst themselves.

=== Relief activities ===
When a Tsunami hit South India on 26 December 2004, it affected many of the people living near the Adyar-compound. The Theosophical Society, through the Theosophical Order of Service, helped the people survive both in the immediate aftermath and later. Similar activities were undertaken after the hurricane that destroyed much of New Orleans in 2005.

=== Province of its influence ===
The influence of the Theosophical Society has been major, especially considering its small size. The new age movement reflected many of its main characteristics, especially holism and eclecticism. In Modern Art, the artists Kandinsky and Mondriaan were both influenced by Theosophy.

=== Theosophical Society and Jiddu Krishnamurti ===
The leadership of the Theosophical Society at Adyar was responsible for promoting young Jiddu Krishnamurti as the new "World Teacher" during the first few decades of the 20th century. Charles Webster Leadbeater, one of the Society's leaders at the time, had "discovered" fourteen-year-old Krishnamurti in 1909, and considered him the likely "vehicle" for the expected reappearance of the Maitreya. However, as a young man in 1929, Krishnamurti disavowed his expected "mission" and disassociated himself from the Theosophical Society and its doctrines and practices. Over the next six decades he pursued an independent course, becoming widely known as an original, influential thinker and speaker on philosophical and religious subjects.

== Publications ==
- Magazines
- Brahmavidya – Adyar Library Bulletin
- The Theosophist – English monthly Current Issue
- Adyar Newsletter – quarterly journal
- Wake Up India – quarterly journal
- The Theosophical Digest – quarterly journal
- Books
- The Key to Theosophy – H. P. Blavatsky
- An Outline of Theosophy – C. W. Leadbeater
- The Ancient Wisdom – Annie Besant
- At the Feet of the Master – Alcyone
- First Principles of Theosophy – C. Jinarajadasa
- Light on the Path – Mabel Collins
- Seven Great Religions – Annie Besant
- Quest Books is the imprint of the Theosophical Publishing House, the publishing arm of the Theosophical Society in America (Wheaton, IL) branch of the International Theosophical Society Adyar.
- Internet maillist – theos-talk – at www.groups.yahoo.com. A very active and independent maillist which has no official connection with any organization; it is a valuable source for up-to-date information on all matters relating to theosophy and TS Adyar and others. The archives are also public.
- Internet Community – www.theosophy.net A new public community website set up by a few interested theosophists. It is totally independent and is not funded or directly or indirectly controlled or moderated by any theosophy organization.

== The garden ==
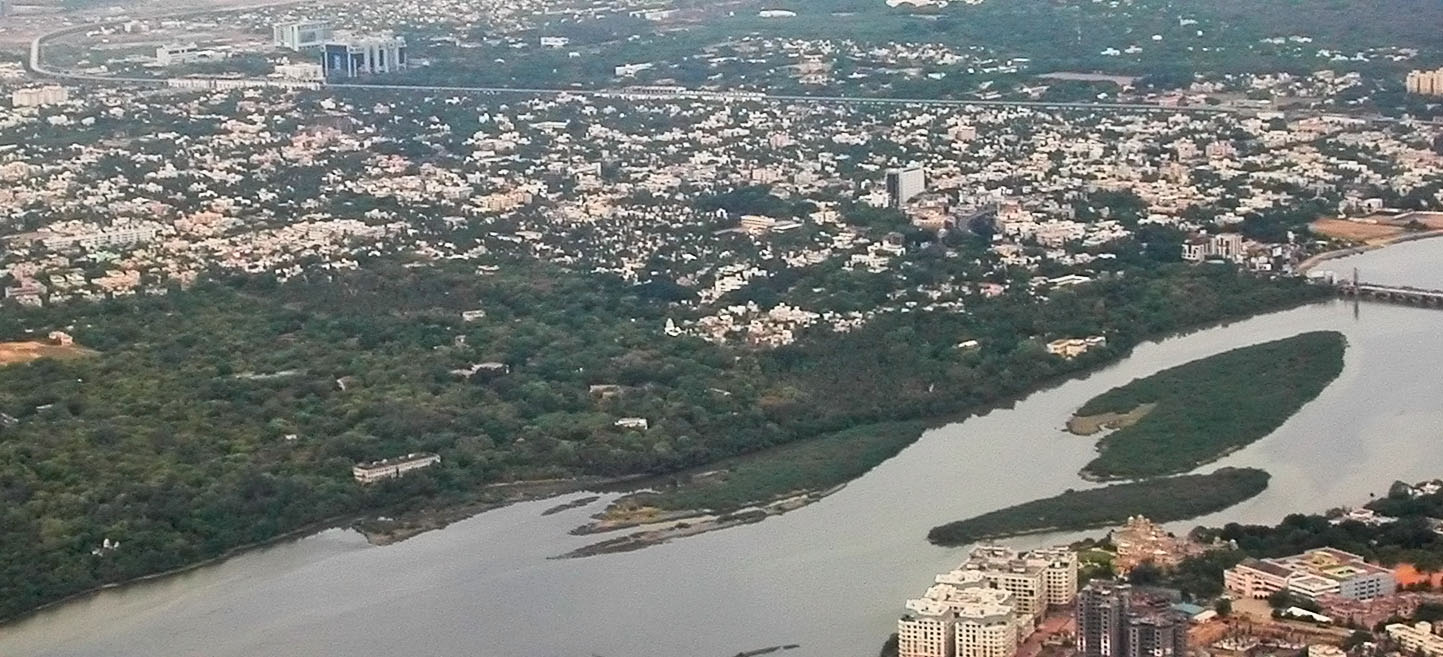
A view of the gardens of the estate of the Theosophical society at Adyar

Known as the "Huddleston Gardens", the Theosophical Society garden lies on the south bank of the Adyar River and covers 260 acres. The garden has migratory birds, fruit bats, snakes, jackals, wild cats, mongooses, hares, and a variety of spiders. Trees include the rare mahogany and other trees from across the globe. The garden also has a 450-year-old banyan tree, which is known locally as Adyar aala maram, whose aerial roots cover some 60,000 sq m. The main trunk fell under its own weight in 1996.

== See also ==
- Edmonton Theosophical Society
- Heritage structures in Chennai
- Survey of Hindu organisations
