= Vizetelly =

Vizetelly is an anglicized form of the Italian surname Vizzetelli. Notable members of the family were active in journalism and publishing from the late 18th century:

- James Henry Vizetelly (died 1838), London-based publisher
- His sons:
  - Henry Vizetelly (1820–1894), publisher and writer
  - Frank Vizetelly (born 1830, disappeared 1883), journalist working in France
- Henry's sons:
  - Edward Henry Vizetelly (1847–1903), war correspondent
  - Ernest Alfred Vizetelly (1853–1922), journalist and author
  - Frank Horace Vizetelly (1864–1938), lexicographer
