= Theosophical Order of Service =

The Theosophical Order of Service (TOS) is an international organization founded in 1908 by Annie Besant, the second international president of the Theosophical Society. Its motto is: "A union of those who love in the service of all that suffers."

The TOS is found in many countries in the world and is engaged in various service projects that seek to alleviate suffering, such as medical missions, assistance during disasters, orphanages, scholarships, establishment of schools, rehabilitation of malnourished children, caring for the disabled, preventing cruelty to animals, promoting vegetarianism, character building for young people, etc. TOS members need not be members of the Theosophical Society, but it is administered by Theosophists.
