= Marty Bax =

Dutch-Canadian art historian (born 1956)

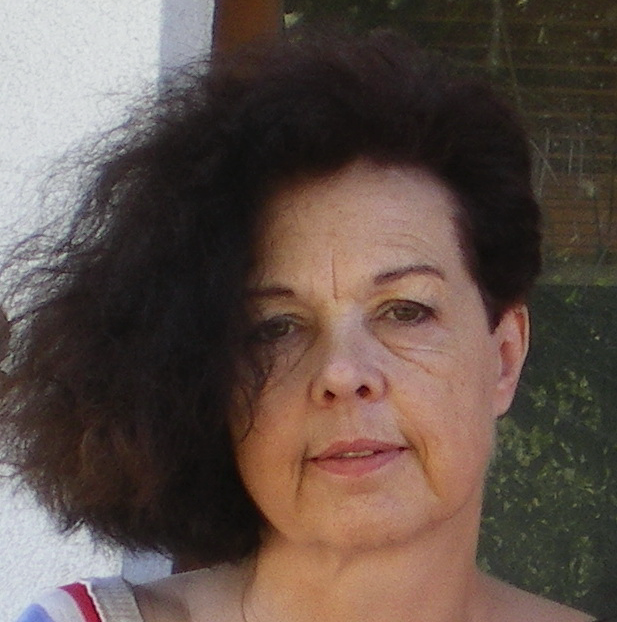
- Born: Martine Theodora; 10 November 1956; Montréal, Québec, Canada
- Citizenship: Canada, Netherlands
- Education: Vrije Universiteit Amsterdam
- Occupation: Art historian
- Known for: Leading scholar in the work of Piet Mondrian; modern art and Western Esotericism; Nazi plunder
- Website: baxart.com

Martine Theodora Bax (born 1956) is a Dutch-Canadian art historian and art critic in modern art. Her specializations are the work of Piet Mondrian, the relationship between art and Western Esotericism, especially Modern Theosophy and Anthroposophy, and Nazi plunder of books during the Second World War.

== Biography ==
Bax was born on 10 November 1956 in Montréal, Québec, Canada. Her parents were both co-founders of and journalists for the newspapers Nieuwe Rotterdamsche Courant and Algemeen Dagblad in Rotterdam Netherlands). In Canada her father Jack was a radio reporter for the Canadian Broadcasting Corporation. After remigration to the Netherlands he became Chief of Public Relations of the City and Port of Rotterdam. He was the first in the Netherlands to implement a public information center for inhabitants, in which city developments were openly discussed. In the 1960s he was one of the first who envisioned local radio and television as public information channels. Bax is the sister of the human rights activist Robert van Voren and of Jacky Bax, programme manager and deputy director at NRPO SIA / Taskforce for Applied Research, formerly Programme Manager Innovation Universities at Ministry of Education, Culture and Science.

== Profession ==
Bax studied art history at the Vrije Universiteit Amsterdam. Her scholarly approach to art is interdisciplinary, combining art history and art analysis with (socioeconomic) history, sociology, philosophy, history of religion and genealogy. She works as an independent (co-)curator of and scholarly adviser to many international institutions on modern art from 1850. She has published many books and essays and wrote entries on Dutch architects for the Oxford Art Online. She has been editor of the university art historical magazine Kunstlicht and founder of its foundation, and editor-in-chief of the scholarly magazine Jong Holland. As an art critic for Het Financieele Dagblad she has written approximately 500 articles on art, architecture, design, institutional and private collecting, and the art market. She organized various conferences, e.g. on Nazi plunder and cultural heritage.

== Mondrian ==
Piet Mondrian. The Amsterdam years 1892–1912 (1994) contains the first extensive analysis of the extensive social and artistic network of Piet Mondrian, based on genealogy and research in primary archival sources. In 1996 she was appointed editor of Volume I of the Catalogue Raisonné of Mondrian's work. The book Mondrian Complete received the Choice Outstanding Academic Title Award in 2002. Ever since her work is cited extensively, she publishes and lectures regularly on aspects of Mondrian's life and art and serves as an authentication expert of his work.

== Western Esotericism ==
Bax started her research into art and Western Esotericism after the exhibition The Spiritual in Art: Abstract Painting 1890–1985 (1986–1987), of which Bax was assistant-curator at the Gemeentemuseum Den Haag in The Hague. In 1991 she published Bauhaus Lecture Notes 1930–1933, in which she describes the continuing influence of Western Esotericism on the theory and practice of the Bauhaus, right until its closing in 1933. The exhibition Okkultismus und Avantgarde (1995), of which Bax was member of the scholarly board and organizer of the Dutch section, was the first exhibition to focus exclusively on the influence of Western Esotericism on European art. In 1996 she joined the study group ARIES, founded by Wouter Hanegraaff and precursor of the European Society for the Study of Western Esotericism. As a member of ESSWE she contributes to international conferences, lectures and scholarly discussion groups. In 2001 she was co-founder of the Stichting ter bevordering van wetenschappelijk Onderzoek naar de geschiedenis van de Vrijmetselarij en verwante stromingen in Nederland (OVN; Foundation for the advancement of academic research into the history of freemasonry and related currents in the Netherlands) to preserve archival and architectural heritage.

Bax' dissertation on Theosophy and art in The Netherlands is the first systematic and interdisciplinary analysis of the relationship between art and Modern Theosophy. It has set an empirical-methodological standard for any research in this complex field of art history. The book contains a prosopography of the members of the Dutch branch of the Theosophical Society, which gives insight into the social and religious structure of the Society. The exhibition Holy Inspiration. Religion and Spirituality on Modern Art (2008) was the first exhibition in the history of the strictly modernist Stedelijk Museum Amsterdam to focus on the religious, spiritual and Western Esoteric sources of inspiration of modern artists in the collection, based on the views of Jürgen Habermas. Parallel she contributed to Traces du sacré held at the Centre Pompidou. In 2010 Bax made the full membership list of the Theosophical Society available online as a primary source for scholarly and family research.

In 2010 she became interested in the life of Grete Trakl, musical prodigy and sister of the Austrian poet Georg Trakl, because of her notes on lectures by Rudolf Steiner. Research resulted in the first comprehensive biography of Grete Trakl, published in 2014. This book contains several chapters on her brother's position within the tradition of Western Esotericism.

From 2013 Bax has published on the work of the Swedish artists Hilma af Klint and Anna Cassel. founders of the group De Fem (The Five). Sigrid Hedman, Mathilda Nilsson and Cornelia Cederberg (sister of Mathilda Nilsson) were the three other members of the group. Bax contributed to the 2013 exhibition and conference in Stockholm, but is critical of the myth created around Hilma af Klint. She focuses on Anna Cassel as the inspirational and creative source of De Fem, and on the broader historical and religious context of the group.

== Nazi Plunder ==
From 2020 Bax has been contracted by the Claims Conference to research the plunder of books and archives in The Netherlands during the Second World War by the Reichsleiter Rosenberg Taskforce (ERR). Millions of books and archives were looted, displaced or destroyed, not only of Jews, the main focus of the plunder, but also of all Dutch religious, esoteric, humanitarian and socially or politically oriented organizations and groups deemed 'subversive' by the Nazis.

== Selected bibliography ==
- Bauhaus Lecture Notes 1930–1933. Theory and practice of architectural training at the Bauhaus, based on the lecture notes made by the Dutch ex-Bauhaus student and architect J.J. van der Linden of the Mies van der Rohe curriculum. Amsterdam & Leiden: Architectura & Natura; Brill. 1991. ISBN 9789071570049.
- Een verzameling – Verstilde momenten. Rotterdam: Caldic. 1992.
- Organic architecture. Rudolf Steiner's building impulse. Amsterdam: Iona Stichting. 1993.
- Mondriaan aan de Amstel 1892–1912. Amsterdam: Gemeentearchief Amsterdam. 1994. ISBN 9789080175020.
- Mondrian. The Amsterdam Years 1892–1912. Bussum: Thoth. 1994. ISBN 9789080175013.
- Il primo Mondrian: Gli anni di Amsterdam. Rome: Galeria Nazionale d'Arte Moderna. 1995. ISBN 9788880161370.
- La beauté exacte. De Van Gogh à Mondrian. L'Art aux Pays-Bas au XXième siècle. Paris: Musée d'Art Moderne de la Ville de Paris. 1994. pp. 40–45. ISBN 9782879001722.
- Bloeiende symbolen. Bloemen in de kunst van het fin de siècle. 's Hertogenbosch: Noordbrabants Museum. 1999. ISBN 9789071349140.
- Innocence and decadence. Flowers in Northern European art 1880–1914. Chichester: Pallant House Gallery. 1999. ISBN 1869827252.
- Symboles en fleurs. Les fleurs dans l'art autour de 1900. Paris: Institut Néerlandais. 1999. ISBN 9789053493045.
- Mondriaan compleet. Alphen aan den Rijn: Atrium. 2001. ISBN 9789066139299.
- Complete Mondrian. Ashgate (Lund Humphries). 2001. ISBN 9780853318033.
- Mondrian complet. Paris: Hazan. 2002. ISBN 9782850258039.
- Kroon, Andréa; Bax, Marty, eds. (2005). Masonic and Esoteric Heritage. New Perspectives for Art and Heritage Policies. 's Gravenhage: Stichting OVN. ISBN 908077782X.
- Het web der schepping. Theosofie en kunst in Nederland van Lauweriks tot Mondriaan. Amsterdam: Uitgeverij SUN. 2006. ISBN 9789085061922.
- Berg, H; Frishman, J., eds. (2007). Dutch Jewry in a Cultural Maelstrom, 1850–1940. Amsterdam: Amsterdam University Press. pp. 127–134. ISBN 9789052602684.
- Karel de Bazel (1869–1923). Vormgever van een nieuwe wereld. Amersfoort: Bekking&Blitz. 2007. ISBN 9789061095972.
- Stedelijk Museum in de Nieuwe Kerk. Heilig Vuur. Religie en spiritualiteit in de moderne kunst – Stedelijk Museum in De Nieuwe Kerk – Holy Inspiration. Religion and Spirituality in Modern Art. Amsterdam: De Nieuwe Kerk – Stedelijk Museum. 2008. ISBN 9789078653080.
- Van privé naar publiek. Kunst verzamelen in Nederland – From private walls to public halls. Collecting Art in the Netherlands. Amsterdam: Accenture – Stichting Lieve. 2008.
- Albrecht Dürer in de Nederlanden. Amersfoort: Bekking&Blitz. 2010. ISBN 9789061091158.
- Albrecht Dürer aux anciens Pays-Bas. Amersfoort: Bekking&Blitz. 2011. ISBN 9789061093312.
- Ben Joppe. Schilder van het onmogelijke. Zierikzee: Stichting Ben Joppe. 2011.
- Immer zu wenig Liebe. Grete Trakl. Ihr feinster Kuppler. Ihre Familie. Amsterdam: DX Media. 2014. ISBN 9789082362404.
- Bax, Marty (2015). de Jong, Cees (ed.). De ateliers van Piet Mondriaan: Amsterdam, Laren, Parijs, Londen, New York (in Dutch) (1 ed.). Amsterdam: Amsterdam University Press. ISBN 9789089648983.
- Bax, Marty (2015). de Jong, Cees (ed.). Piet Mondrian: The Studios (1 ed.). London: Thames & Hudson. ISBN 9780500239353. OCLC 907140328.
- Otte, Katjuscha; Vermeulen, Ingelies; Welsh, Robert P; Bax, Marty; Degen, Marjory (2015). de Jong, Cees (ed.). Piet Mondrian: life and work (1 ed.). New York: Abrams. ISBN 9781419714085. OCLC 890510112.
- Anna Cassel & Hilma af Klint. Childhood, 1907. Vision of a new Swedish Christian Identity. Amsterdam. Baxbooks. ISBN 9789082362442.
- Anna Cassel & Hilma af Klint. The Stockholm 1913 exhibition. The consequences. Amsterdam. Baxbooks. ISBN 9789082362435.
