= Alma Arnell =

Swedish artist (1857–1934)

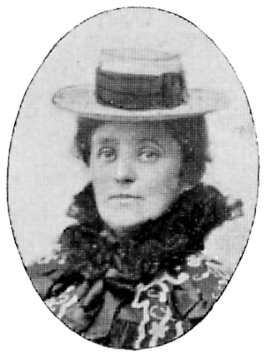
- Born: 2 May 1857; Säbrå, Sweden
- Died: 13 September 1934 (aged 77); Stockholm, Sweden
- Occupation: Painter
- Known for: Genre, portrait, and landscape painting

Alma Constantia Arnell (2 May 1857 – 13 September 1934) was a Swedish painter.

== Biography ==
Born in Säbrå, Ångermanland, Arnell studied in Stockholm at Axel Kulle's school of painting under Gustaf Cederström and Anders Zorn as well as in Paris at the Académie Colarossi and for several years in Rome. In 1904 she was elected to the Nya Idun women's association.

In the late 1890s and early 1900s, at least until 1907, Alma Arnell shared a studio with Hilma af Klint and Lotten Rönquist in the so-called Ateljébyggnaden ('Studio Building') in Stockholm, which the Royal Swedish Academy of Fine Arts owned at Hamngatan 5 at the intersection of Hamngatan and Kungsträdgården. The property was the cultural centre of Stockholm at the time. The same building also housed Blanch's Café and Blanch's Art Salon, where the battle between the Royal Academy of Fine Arts' conventional view of art and the Konstärsförbundet's French-inspired opposition movement took place.

Arnell died in 1934 in Stockholm.

She was primarily a genre painter, and a portrait and landscape painter. Some of her work is on display at Nationalmuseum.
