= Arthur Langen =

German magistrate

Arthur Langen (born 13 January 1858 in Berlin; died 25 October 1927 in Solingen) was a German magistrate with the Berlin Government and privately active in the theater industry. He was the husband of the pianist Grete Trakl, the sister of the Austrian poet Georg Trakl.

== Ancestry and family ==
Arthur Adolph Conrad Maria Hermann Felix Langen was born into Mecklenburg gentry. He was the son of Ida Paulina Francisca von Langen-von Plessen, daughter of colonel August Leopold Emil von Plessen and Susanna Ida von Pentz. He had three sisters: Baroness Gustava Luise Johanne Ottilie Olga (Olga) von Langen (1849–1929), in 1871 married to Werner Jasper Vollrath Julius von Bülow (1840–1909), son of Carl Friedrich Vollrad von Bülow and Elisabeth Flögel; Baroness Henriette Louise (Lolo) von Langen (1853–?) (unmarried); and her twin sister Baroness Natalie Hermine (Lilla) von Langen (1853 – after 1933), in 1888 married to the Samurai Yônojô Kashiwamura (Yo Kasiwa Mura), (Hagi 1849-Berlin 1912), ambassador of Japan and China, military attaché of Germany, Austria and the Netherlands at the Japanese Embassy in Berlin and glass manufacturer in Yokohama and Tokyo.

Their father was Baron Alfred Friedrich Franz Otto von Langen, Passee/Kirch Mulsow 1821–Moisall 1888, Troup Captain of the Dragoon Regiment of the Grand Duke of Mecklenburg and landowner of the districts Moisall and Moorhagen. The fact that Arthur was baptized as his mother's natural son does not exclude the possibility that he also was a biological son of Alfred von Langen; the mother was already pregnant when the couple separated. However, as the mother was indicated as 'separated' and not 'divorced' at Arthur's baptism – an unusual term at that time – Arthur lost his highborn title. In 1886, he was married as 'Plessen' to Anne Marie Helène Petitpierre 1860–?), optician at Unter den Linden, daughter of the royal optician Louis-Godefroi Petitpierre and Mathilde Florentine Polack. The couple had three children and divorced in 1906. On 20 March 1896 Arthur Langen filed an official request at the Government Commissioner Robert Hue de Grais in Potsdam to have his name changed to 'Langen', which was granted to him. In daily life he used 'Langen' and 'von Langen' interchangeably until 1905.

== Theater and publishing ==
In his spare time Langen was passionately involved in theater as a manager, publisher and talent scout. He separated these activities rigorously from his official profession. He had himself listed in the Berlin address books at two different addresses, and in his theater activities he always operated in the background, mostly as a networker among authors, theater agents and important publishing companies. Langen was an entrepreneur who calculated his chances for success and who moved swiftly. Projects initiated and developed by him were often taken over by others soon or were incorporated in existing structures. Remaining sources produce the following, be it fragmentary, picture of his activities:

Langen was the manager of Ludwig Barnay's Berliner Theater until the last moved to Wiesbaden in 1894. Between 1892 and 1896 Langen wrote several plays, next to his work as a publisher.

In 1901 Albert Langen commissioned him to develop the theater section of his publishing house. The work relationship was terminated in the summer of 1903 because of discontent of the solicitor of the company, Ludwig Thoma.

In 1901 Langen traveled to London and obtained full copyright on the German editions of theater plays by Oscar Wilde.

In 1904 he established the Deutsche Bühne Ltd, which was liquidated in 1914. Manager in 1904 was Heinz Wolfradt, whose son Willi went on to become a well-known art historian and critic. In 1905 the company was incorporated into the theater publishing house of Eduard Bloch in Berlin, the largest company in this field.

In 1909 Langen founded a magazine, Die Bühne. Zeitschrift für direktoriale Interessen. The manager this time was the playwright Ernst Neumann-Jödemann. This magazine aimed at the theater directors to professionalize the booming theater business. The magazine also operated as a direct intermediary between authors and theaters; authors could have their plays proof-read and edited by the editorial committee. The magazine was quickly, in 1909, taken over by the Deutsche Theater-Zeitschrift. Wochenschrift für Bühnenkunst und Bühnenpraxis, which had been established in 1908 by the theater director Gustav Hartung. From 1911 onwards it continued as the Neue Theater-Zeitschrift.

In 1911 Langen became co-manager of the new Kurfürsten-Oper, established by the lawyer Max Epstein. This company went bankrupt in 1913 due to bad management by the director Victor Palfi. In 1915 the theater was reestablished as the Deutsches Künstler-Theater.

Between 1912 and 1916 Langen worked for the Berlin branch of the Deutsche Verlags Anstalt (DVA), one of the major German publishing houses.

On 1 April 1916 Langen was appointed head of the theater section of the Kurt Wolff Verlag in Leipzig. This branch flourished until 12 September 1917, when four major theater publishers merged into Die Vereinigte Bühnenvertriebe Drei Masken / Georg Müller / Erich Reiß / Kurt Wolff Verlag, Berlin.

From 1918 until his death in 1927 Langen traveled between Berlin and Solingen, where he worked together with, among others, Louise Dumont, the manager of the Schauspielhaus Düsseldorf and a close friend of his late mother.

== Marriage with Grete Trakl ==
Most likely Langen met the musical prodigy Grete Trakl in the autumn of 1910. This date is cited in research on the poems by Georg Trakl, because Langen copied some of his poems at approximately that time. The couple was engaged in March 1911. The couple only married on 17 July 1912, after an unsavory court procedure in Salzburg, in which Langen finally acquired legal permission to marry his fiancée. By marrying Grete he withdrew his protégé from the influence of the Trakl family, who lived in debt and refused to invest in Grete's talent any further. Langen engaged the German-American avant-garde pianist Richard Buhlig as her private tutor.

When Grete inherited a considerable amount of money from her brother Georg after his death in November 1914, Langen also secured this estate for her. The couple separated in 1916, after it had become clear that Grete would not become a concert pianist due to emotional instability.

Langen was in Berlin when Grete died. As the closest relative in the area at the time of autopsy and identification at the Mortuary of the Institut für Rechtsmedizin of the Charité, he most likely determined Grete's burial place.

== Literature ==
- Correspondence by and to Arthur Langen can be found in the Deutsches Literaturarchiv Marbach (with, among others, Arthur Schnitzler, Else Lasker-Schüler) and in the Goethe-Schiller-Archiv, Weimar (with Rudolf von Poellnitz, Insel Verlag).
