= Anna Cassel =

Swedish artist (1860–1937)

Anna Maria Augusta Cassel (15 March 1860 close to Grythyttan – 18 February 1937 in Stockholm) was a Swedish artist. She mainly painted landscapes from Norrland, Skåne, Västmanland and around Stockholm, made in oil or in tempera.

== Biography ==
Anna Cassel was the daughter of the company manager Per August Cassel and Josefina Ramberg. She belonged to a wealthy family. She lived with her mother and three of her four sisters, Lotten, Emma and Elin at Engelbrektsgatan 31 in Stockholm.

Cassel was described by her brother-in-law Karl Öhman, who in an unpublished book describes their relation from the common standpoint in their interest for painting : "Anna Cassel gave me another direction. Not through any moral nor philosophical discussion, but through her moral artistic personality. Her strong personality had a strong impact on me, and art the moderating context."

Cassel was a lifelong friend of the artist Hilma af Klint. The two first met in 1878 when Cassel started studying at Slöjdskolan, the year before it changed name to Tekniska skolan (now called Konstfack). They pursued their studies at Academy of Fine Arts in Stockholm. The two women shared a strong interest in the spiritual movement. Anna Cassel was a member of the Edelweiss Society at the same time as Hilma af Klint. In 1904, she became member of the Theosophical Lodge of Stockholm, where her sister Lotten Cassel had been a member since 1895.

== De Fem ==
In 1896 Cassel and Hilma af Klint founded the group De Fem (The Five). Sigrid Hedman, Mathilda Nilsson and Cornelia Cederberg (sister of Mathilda Nilsson) were the three other members of the group. They began as an ordinary spiritualist group and their paintings took spiritual and ritual themes.

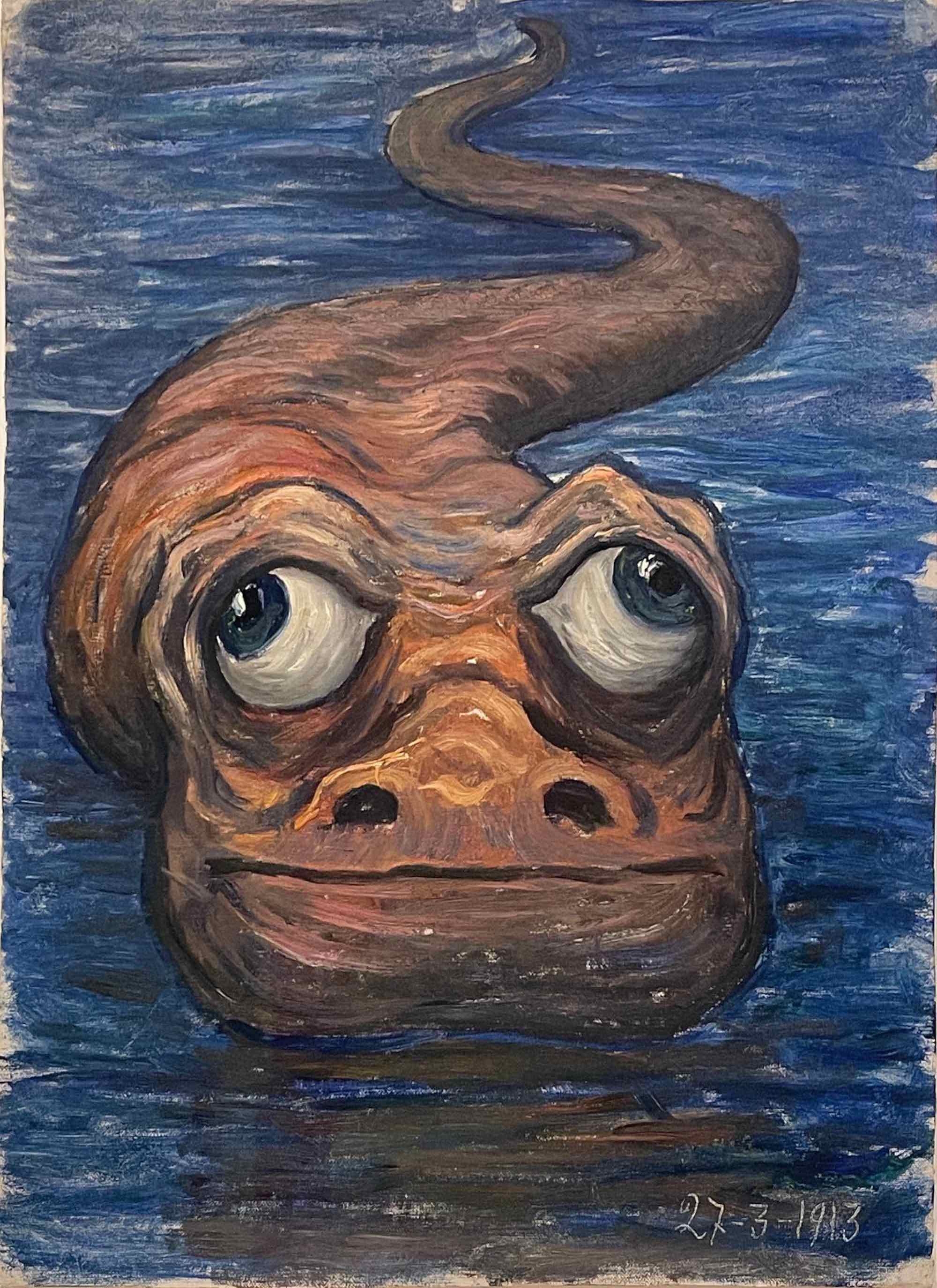
Anna Cassel, 7, 1913.

The artists in their seances were said to have communicated with spirits through a psychograph, an instrument for recording spirit writings, or a trance medium. During these events, spirit leaders presented themselves by name and promised to help the group's members in their spiritual training. The spirits communicating with the five women were mostly Gregor, Georg, Clemens, Ananda och Amaliel. Such leaders are common in spiritualist literature and life. Through their spiritual guidance, the group was inspired to draw automatically in pencil, a technique that was not unusual at that time. When the hand moved automatically, the conscious will did not direct the pattern that developed on the paper, and, in theory, the women thus became artistic tools for their spirit leaders. This technique, called automatism was used a decade later by the Surrealists.

In a series of sketchbooks, religious scenes and symbols were depicted in drawings made by the group collectively. Their drawing technique developed in such a way that abstract patterns—dependent on the free movement of the hand—became visible.

The group De Fem ceased to meet in 1907. Several of its members went over to collaborate with Hilma af Klint for the Paintings for the Temple. In the new group, Anna Cassel would play a key role, besides Hilma af Klint.

Anna Cassel also came to assist Hilma af Klint financially through most part of her life. Among others, she financed the new studio built on the island Munsö not far from Stockholm, which was inaugurated in 1917. This is where Hilma af Klint's paintings were stored when she died.
