= Richard Buhlig =

American pianist

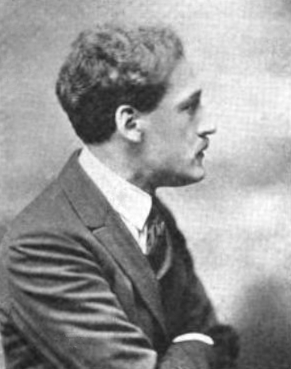
- In the Pacific Coast Musical Review, November 27, 1920
- Born: Richard Moritz Buhlig; December 21, 1880 Chicago, Illinois
- Died: January 30, 1952 (aged 71) Los Angeles, California
- Occupation: Pianist

Richard Moritz Buhlig (December 21, 1880 – January 30, 1952) was an American pianist.

== Early life and education ==
Buhlig was born in Chicago to a German immigrant father from Saxony, the baker Moritz Buhlig, and his wife Louise. He received early lessons from August Hyllested, Wilhelm Middelschulte and Margaret Cameron, who had studied with the legendary Teodor Leszetycki. In 1897, 16-year-old Buhlig moved to Vienna to study with Teodor Leszetycki himself.

== Career and performances ==
Upon completing his studies in 1900, he gave his first public concert in 1901 in Berlin, and toured extensively in Europe until late 1906. He lived in Berlin until May 1916, where he tutored pupils privately, among others Grete Sultan and Grete Trakl, the sister of the Austrian poet Georg Trakl.

In 1907, Buhlig made his first mature American debut, with the Philadelphia Orchestra in New York City. In 1918, Buhlig joined the staff of the Juilliard School (then called "Institute of Musical Art") in New York as a piano teacher: he gave recitals of Beethoven, Brahms, Chopin, Schubert and Schumann (with emphasis on Beethoven). However, he soon left the position and went to Europe again. Some years later, he returned to the US and settled in Los Angeles, dividing his time between teaching and performing. He died in Los Angeles.

As a pianist, Buhlig was highly regarded for his performances of Bach (particularly the two piano transcriptions of The Art of Fugue he made and performed), late Beethoven and Brahms. However, much of his repertoire was contemporary or near-contemporary music. He gave the American premiere of Arnold Schoenberg's Op. 11 and performed pieces by other European modernists such as Ferruccio Busoni, Béla Bartók, Zoltán Kodály and Claude Debussy. He also played music by new composers: Ruth Crawford and Adolf Weiss among others. In the 1920s, he began playing Henry Cowell (whom he also taught) and his circle. In the early 1930s, Buhlig tutored John Cage: it was he who advised Cage to study with Schoenberg. The German pianist Grete Sultan, mentor to Christian Wolff and friend to Cage (whom she had met in 1946 through Buhlig), had studied under Buhlig in early 1910s - they became lifelong friends.
