= Grete Trakl =

Austrian pianist (1891–1917)

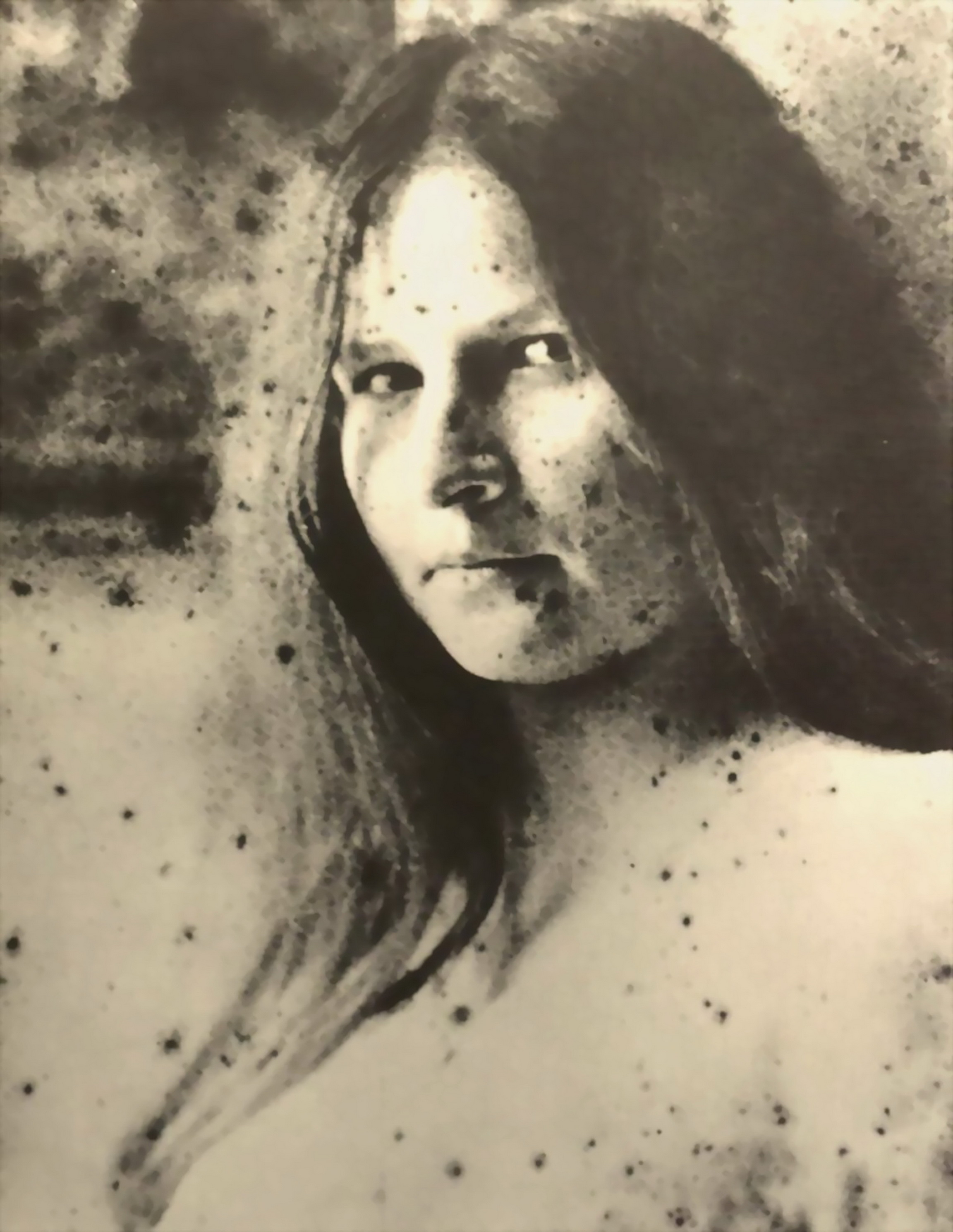
- Born: Margarethe Jeanne Trakl; 8 August 1891 Salzburg, Duchy of Salzburg, Austria-Hungary
- Died: 17 September 1917 (aged 26) Berlin, German Empire
- Occupation: Musician, pianist
- Citizenship: Austria-Hungary / Germany
- Relatives: Georg Trakl (brother)

Margarethe Jeanne "Grete" Trakl (married name Grete Langen; 8 August 1891 – 21 September 1917) was an Austrian pianist and sister of poet Georg Trakl.

== Family and ancestry ==
Margarethe Jeanne Trakl was born in Salzburg as the youngest of seven children. She also had an elder half-brother, Wilhelm, son of the father's first marriage. Tobias Trakl (1837–1910) was an ironmonger. As a merchant and owner of a house at Waagplatz he became an official citizen of the city of Salzburg. From that time, the family strived to be regarded as bourgeois, in the sense of belonging to "Bildungsbürgertum", although the family from both sides could hardly be regarded as such. Tobias Trakl (originally Trackl) came from Ödenburg (Sopron) in Hungary, where his family can be traced back until the middle of the 17th century, earning a living as winegrowers. The mother, Maria Catharina Halik (1852–1925), also spelled Hallick or Hawlick, was born in Wiener Neustadt, but her family came from Prague. Her ancestors were all Slavs; they can be traced back until the mid-1700s in Prague's Nové Mešto (New Town), working as gardeners.

== Education ==
As a child, Grete grew up in the spacious Weigh house in the middle of the Waagplatz/Mozartplatz. When she was six years old she went to the local catholic public school. She was a good pupil and hardly ever ill. In 1901 she was sent to a boarding school for girls in Sankt Pölten, the "Internat der Englischen Fräulein". Here too she got good grades and was hardly sick. In the third grade however she received the highest grades for only three subjects: manners, music and singing. Grete was musically very talented; already as a child she outperformed her siblings, who all received piano lessons.

In 1904 Grete moved from St. Pölten to Vienna to stay at the boarding school "Notre Dame de Sion". At this school she gained better opportunities to develop her talent. During the last year (1908–1909) of the "Higher French School" of this institute she was allowed to enroll at the University of Music and Performing Arts, Vienna at the same time. She was admitted into the second year, skipping the first, because of her musical abilities. She left the Conservatory however before the year was over.

From autumn 1909 onwards Grete lived on her own in Vienna and was probably privately tutored by a (hitherto unknown) pianist, as was the practice with talented pupils. During this academic year she regularly met her brother Georg and his friend Erhard Buschbeck. Buschbeck provided Grete with opium. Over the years a long-lasting friendship developed between the two.

In late April 1910 Grete returned to Salzburg. In June the father died, an event that elicited the rapid economic downfall of the Trakl family. The inheritance, which was by law evenly divided between the mother and the children, consisted of a business debt of around 1 million Euros (converted to modern purchasing power). Grete's half-brother Wilhelm was appointed her guardian; as the eldest son of Tobias Trakl he also took over the business.

In 1910 the Hungarian pianist Ernö Dohnányi, professor of music at the Königliche Hochschule für Musik, selected Grete as one of his pupils. In October Grete moved to Berlin.

== Marriage ==
In Berlin Grete came to live in the guesthouse Linder, Grolmanstraße 36-III. Soon after she met her future husband: Arthur Langen, 34 years older than she, magistrate at the Berlin Government and, in his spare time, publisher of theater literature and avid networker and talent scout in music and theater business. His sisters lived next-door and also owned a guesthouse.

Arthur is said to have supported Grete financially from March 1911 onwards, because her half-brother Willy and her mother refused to pay the education any further. From this date they were also engaged. This is revealed by the court procedure initiated by Langen in 1912 to acquire legal permission to marry Grete. During this judicial process Willy withdrew from custody. In his place her brother Georg was appointed, who eventually gave permission. Meanwhile, the Salzburg court tried to rule out matchmaking as the motive for the marriage. Georg, who watched over Grete's talent and well-being, would later regard himself as "the finest matchmaker" between his sister and Langen. There was no incestuous relationship between Georg and Grete, as popular reception history still supposes. In Grete's biography there is also no trace of drug addiction, let alone as a result of her brother's drug use.

The marriage took place in Berlin on 17 July 1912. Grete's new private tutor was the German-American avant-garde pianist Richard Buhlig. In August 1912 she sent him no less than 15 poems by her brother. Some of these poems were copied by her and 4 of the poems are totally unknown: "Empfindung", "Einsamkeit", "Elenden" und "Der sterbende Wald". A fifth poem from Grete's collection, Helian's Schicksalslied, has long been in the Ludwig Ficker estate at the Brenner Archiv of the University of Innsbruck.

When Grete spent her summer holidays in Salzburg in 1913, she had a short liaison with Erhard Buschbeck. In the winter of 1913–1914 she was ready to start her concert career, but she became pregnant and had a miscarriage in March 1914. Georg travelled to Berlin to support her and later tried to get her to Salzburg. Grete however stayed in Berlin. The two never saw each other again. Georg went into the army and died in Kraków on 3 November 1914.

== The inheritance ==
Georg bequeathed Grete 20,000 Austrian Crowns, a large sum of money at that time. He had received this money from his art czar Ludwig (von) Ficker, who in his turn had received it from Ludwig Wittgenstein to support promising artists. Grete and her husband travelled to Innsbruck to secure the inheritance, but eventually the family took the money in, and Grete was sent to the private clinic of the Kreuzschwestern (Sisters of the Cross) in Innsbruck. She stayed there for two weeks and then returned to Berlin in March 1915. She was not happy there; the marriage was under pressure. During the Summer of 1915 she amused herself in Innsbruck with Georg's former colleagues of the Der Brenner magazine. From October 1915 onwards she stayed with the family in Salzburg again.

== Divorce and death ==
In January 1916 Arthur Langen started the divorce procedure in Berlin. On 10 March the couple was divorced on the grounds of adultery committed by Grete with Ludwig Ficker and Richard Buhlig. At that time she was already staying in the psychiatric clinic Neufriedenheim in Munich, for which the Trakl family went into debt once more. Grete most likely only returned to Salzburg at the end of 1916, where she was very unhappy again. In the meantime the late father's business had been deleted from the Commercial Register.

In July 1917 Grete was sent to Berlin to retrieve furniture, presumably the furniture she had left behind in 1915, to be sold by the family in order to alleviate the financial problems. On 21 September 1917 at 21:00 she was found, having shot herself, at Potsdamer Straße 134A, Der Sturm gallery's address.

With probability bordering on certainty Grete was buried at the Neue St. Matthäi cemetery in Berlin-Schöneberg, as this cemetery is mentioned in the autopsy register and was determined by the next of kin, most likely Arthur Langen himself. In 1938 the larger part of this cemetery was cleared by the Nazis because of the plans for the Welthauptstadt Germania. The bones of the deceased of which the rest period had expired – Grete's had expired in September 1937 – were reburied in two mass graves at the Stahnsdorf South-Western Cemetery.

== Bibliography ==
- Marty Bax: Immer zu wenig Liebe. Grete Trakl. Ihr feinster Kuppler. Ihre Familie. Amsterdam 2014, E-Book (E-book).
- Hans Weichselbaum: Georg Trakl. Eine Biographie mit Bildern, Texten und Dokumenten. Salzburg 2014 (2nd edition), ISBN 978-3701312191.
- General information on persons around Grete Trakl (German text) .
- Helian's Schicksalslied, see Brenner Archiv at Universität Innsbruck.
- Harald Stockhammer: A 367/14 Bezirksgericht Hall in Tirol – Das Verlassenschaftsverfahren nach Georg Trakl. In: Mitteilungen aus dem Brenner-Archiv 33/2014, pp. 109–125.
