= Hilma af Klint =

Swedish artist (1862–1944)

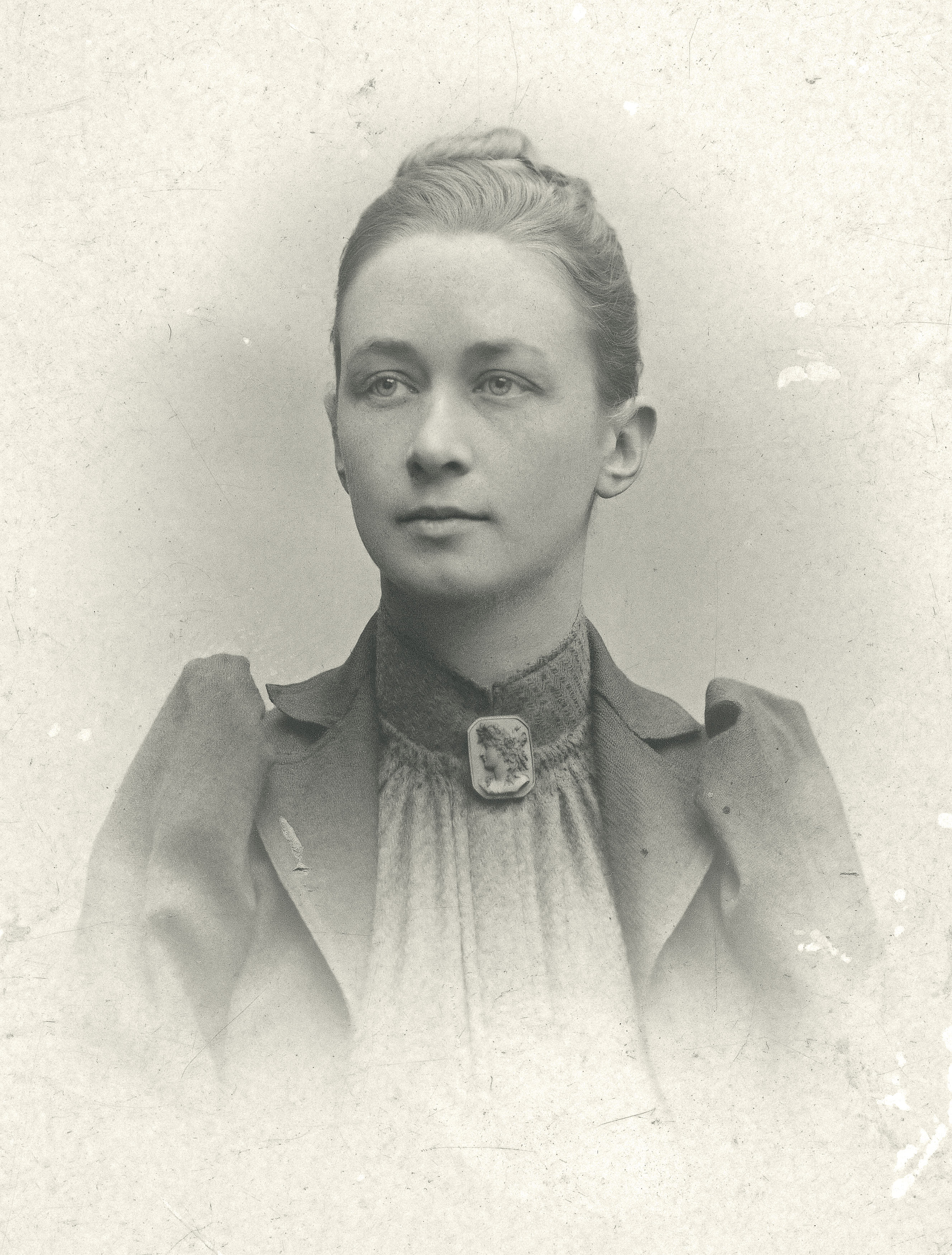
- Portrait, c. 1901 or earlier
- Born: 26 October 1862; Karlberg Palace, Solna, Sweden
- Died: 21 October 1944 (aged 81); Danderyd, Sweden
- Resting place: Galärvarvskyrkogården, Stockholm, Sweden
- Education: Tekniska skolan, Royal Swedish Academy of Arts
- Known for: Painting
- Movement: Abstract art

Hilma af Klint (Swedish: [ˈhɪ̂lːma ˈɑːv ˈklɪnːt]; 26 October 1862 – 21 October 1944) was a Swedish artist and mystic whose paintings are considered to be among the first major abstract works in Western art history. A considerable body of her work predates the first purely abstract compositions by Kandinsky, Malevich, and Mondrian. She belonged to a group called "The Five", a circle of women inspired by Theosophy who shared a belief in the importance of trying to contact the "High Masters", often through séances. Her paintings, which sometimes resemble diagrams, were a visual representation of complex spiritual ideas.

== Early life ==
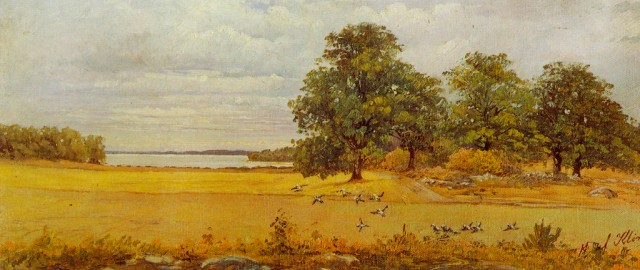
Eftersommar (Late Summer) an early naturalistic work, painted by af Klint in 1903, an example of the works she exhibited to the public during her lifetime

Hilma af Klint was the fourth child of Mathilda (née Sonntag) and Captain Victor af Klint, a Swedish naval commander. The family surname is 'af Klint', af being a Swedish nobiliary particle. She spent summers with her family at their manor, "Hanmora", on the island of Adelsö on Lake Mälaren. In these idyllic surroundings, she came into contact with nature at an early age. Her experience of natural forms became an inspiration in her work, and she later lived on Munsö, an island next to Adelsö.

Af Klint showed a great interest in mathematics and botany and an ability in visual art. After the family moved to Stockholm, she studied at Tekniska skolan (Technical School, now Konstfack) in Stockholm, where she studied portraiture and landscape painting.

Af Klint was admitted to the Royal Academy of Fine Arts at the age of twenty. Between 1882 and 1887, she studied portrait painting, botanical drawing, and landscape painting. She graduated with honors and was granted a scholarship in the form of a studio in the "Atelier Building" (Ateljébyggnaden) owned by the Academy of Fine Arts between Hamngatan and Kungsträdgården in central Stockholm, which was the main cultural hub in the Swedish capital at that time. The same building also held Blanch's Café and Blanch's Art Gallery, where conflict arose between the conventional views of the Academy of Fine Arts and the opposition movement of the Art Society (Konstnärsförbundet), inspired by the French plein air painters. Af Klint began working in Stockholm, gaining recognition for her landscapes, botanical drawings, and portraits. Her conventional painting was a source of income, but her abstract remained a separate practice.

== Spiritual and philosophical ideas ==
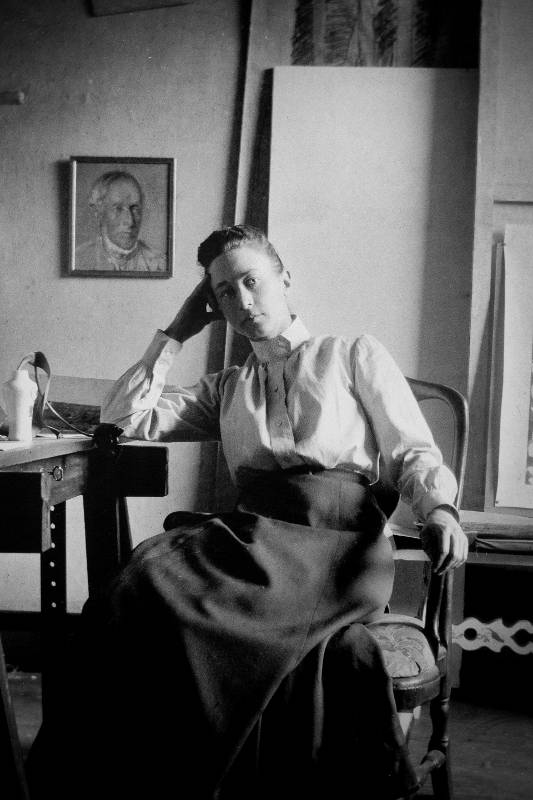
af Klint in her studio, c. 1895

In 1880, af Klint's younger sister Hermina died. Around this time, the spiritual dimension of her life had begun to develop. Af Klint's interest in abstraction and symbolism grew from her involvement in spiritism, which was very much in vogue at the end of the nineteenth and beginning of the twentieth century. Her experiments in spiritual investigation started in 1879. She became interested in the Theosophy of Helena Blavatsky and the philosophy of Christian Rosenkreuz. In 1908, she met Rudolf Steiner, the founder of the Anthroposophical Society, who was visiting Stockholm. Steiner introduced her to his theories regarding the arts, and appears to have influenced her paintings later in life. Several years later, in 1920, she met Steiner again at the Goetheanum in Dornach, Switzerland, the headquarters of the Anthroposophical Society. Between 1921 and 1930, she spent long periods at the Goetheanum.

Af Klint's work can be understood in the wider context of the modernist search for new forms in artistic, spiritual, political, and scientific systems at the beginning of the twentieth century. Other artists during this same period, including Wassily Kandinsky, Piet Mondrian, Kazimir Malevich, Fidus, and the French Les Nabis, were inspired by the Theosophical Society.

The works of af Klint are mainly spiritual, and her artistic work is a consequence of this. She felt the abstract work and the meaning within were so groundbreaking that the world was not ready to see it, so she directed that the work remain unseen until twenty years after her death.

== Work ==
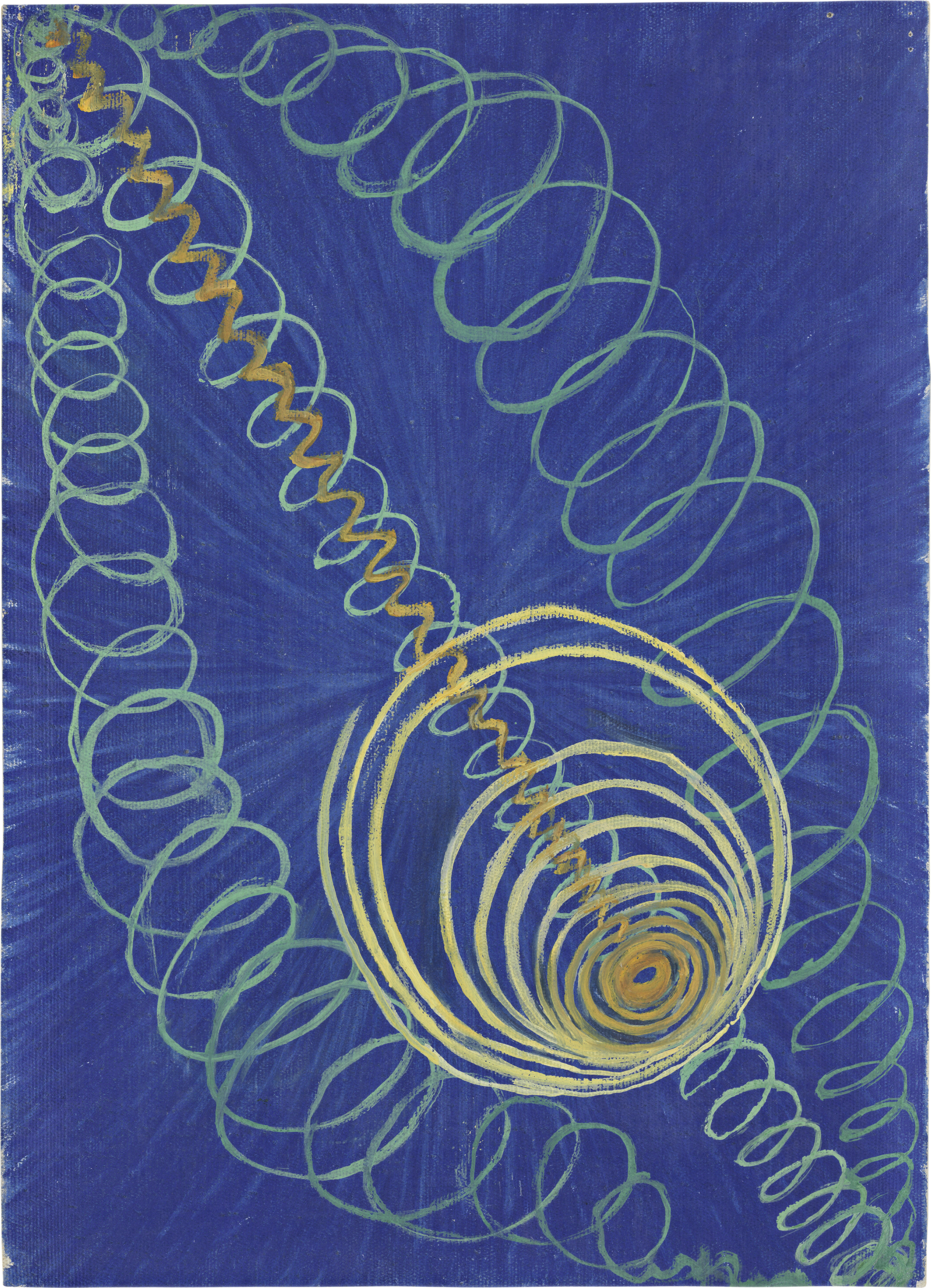
Primordial Chaos, No. 16, 1906–07

At the Academy of Fine Arts she met Anna Cassel, the first of the four women with whom she later worked in "The Five" (De Fem), a group of artists who shared her ideas. The other members were Cornelia Cederberg, Sigrid Hedman, and Mathilda Nilsson. The Five began their association as members of the Edelweiss Society, which embraced a combination of the Theosophical teachings of Helena Blavatsky and spiritualism. All of The Five were interested in the paranormal and regularly organized spiritistic séances. They opened each meeting with a prayer, followed by a meditation, a Christian sermon, and a review and analysis of a text from the New Testament, followed by a séance. They recorded in a book a completely new system of mystical thought, in the form of messages from higher spirits called The High Masters ("Höga Mästare"). One Master, Gregor, announced, "All the knowledge that is not of the senses, not of the intellect, not of the heart but is the property that exclusively belongs to the deepest aspect of your being ... the knowledge of your spirit".

Through her work with The Five, Hilma af Klint created experimental automatic drawing as early as 1896, leading her toward an inventive geometric visual language capable of conceptualizing invisible forces of the inner and outer worlds. She explored world religions, atoms, and the plant world, and wrote extensively about her discoveries. Af Klint created metaphors to express the messages she was receiving from the High Masters, the spirits who the artist believed used her as a conduit. As she became more familiar with this form of expression, af Klint was "assigned" by the High Masters to create the paintings for the "Temple", although she said that never understood what the "Temple" referred to.

Af Klint said that she felt she was being directed by a force that would literally guide her hand. She wrote in her notebook:

The pictures were painted directly through me, without any preliminary drawings, and with great force. I had no idea what the paintings were supposed to depict; nevertheless I worked swiftly and surely, without changing a single brush stroke.

In 1906, at the age of 44, af Klint painted her first series of abstract paintings.

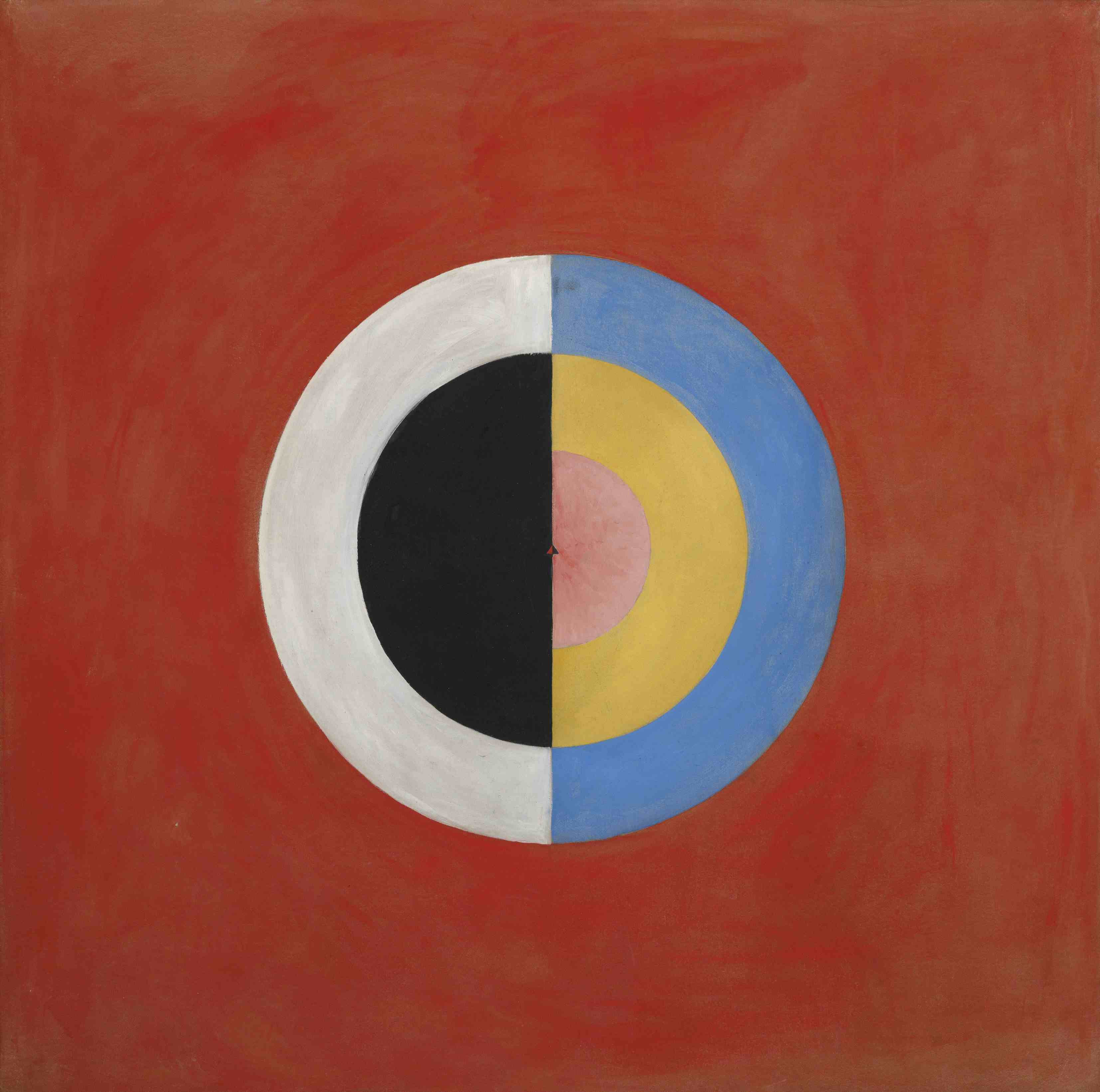
Svanen (The Swan), No. 17, Group 9, Series SUW, October 1914 – March 1915, a work never exhibited during af Klint's lifetime

The works for the Temple were created between 1906 and 1915, carried out in two phases, with an interruption between 1908 and 1912. Art critic Daniel Birnbaum argues that Anna Cassel likely contributed to af Klint's Temple paintings. As af Klint discovered her new form of visual expression, she developed a new artistic language. Her painting became more autonomous and more intentional. The spiritual would continue to be the main source of creativity throughout the rest of her life.

The collection for the Temple comprises 196 paintings grouped within several sub-series. The major paintings, dated 1907, are large: each painting measures approximately 240 × 320 cm. This series, called The Ten Largest, describes the stages of life, from early childhood to old age.

Quite apart from their diagrammatic purpose, the paintings have a freshness and a modern aesthetic of tentative line and hastily captured image, such as a segmented circle, a helix bisected and divided into a spectrum of lightly painted colors. The artistic world of af Klint is infused with symbols, letters, and words. The paintings often depict symmetrical dualities or reciprocities: up and down, in and out, earthly and esoteric, male and female, good and evil. The color choice throughout is metaphorical: blue stands for the female spirit, yellow for the male one, and pink/red for physical/spiritual love. The Swan and the Dove, names of two series of the Paintings for the Temple, are also symbolic, representing, respectively, transcendence and love. Understood as gates to other dimensions, her paintings call for interpretation on a narrative, esoteric, and artistic level while evoking primordial geometry and humanistic motifs.

When af Klint had completed works for the Temple, the "spiritual guidance" ended, but she continued to pursue abstract painting independent of any "external influence". The paintings for the Temple were mostly oil paintings, but she now also used watercolors. Her later paintings are significantly smaller in size. She painted among others a series depicting the standpoints of religions at various stages in history, as well as representations of the duality between physical being and its equivalence on an esoteric level. As af Klint pursued her artistic and esoteric research, it is possible to perceive the influence of the artistic theories developed by the Anthroposophical Society. Through her life, af Klint would seek to understand the mysteries that she had felt through her work. She produced more than 150 notebooks containing her thoughts and studies.

In 1908, af Klint met Rudolf Steiner. In one of their few remaining letters, she asked Steiner to visit her in Stockholm to see the Paintings for the Temple series, 111 paintings in total. She wrote in her personal notebook:

The execution of the work began a few years before Dr. Steiner first came to Sweden, and when I heard about him, it was immediately clear to me that he was the one who would confirm what I had perceived. Under the guidance of one, or perhaps several intelligences, the work is executed in a number of painted pictures, some very small, some very large. This logically constructed work contains an explanation of the evolution of mankind over vast periods of time. There are two reasons why I wish to interest the Anthroposophical Society in this work, namely, my absolute belief in the authenticity of the inspiration, and Dr. Steiner’s confirmation of it when, 14 or 15 years ago, he looked at the first two series then completed, on which he made a detailed explanation. Since then the work has continued, and this year I have once again personally appealed to Dr. Steiner to find out about the work. Whether it should be preserved, or whether it should be destroyed. The answer was, that it would be detrimental to let it disappear and that it could be used and useful.

According to Helena Blavatsky, mediumship was a false practice, leading its adepts on the wrong paths of occultism and black magic. Steiner stated that af Klint's contemporaries would not be able to accept and understand her paintings, and that it would take another fifty years to decipher them. Of all the paintings shown to him, Steiner paid special attention only to the Primordial Chaos Group, noting them as "the best symbolically". Af Klint was devastated by Steiner's response and, apparently, stopped painting for four years. Steiner kept photographs of some of af Klint's artworks, some of which were hand-coloured. Later the same year, Steiner met Wassily Kandinsky, who had not yet come to abstract painting. Some art historians assume that Kandinsky might have seen the photographs and perhaps was influenced by them while developing his own abstract path. Hilma af Klint and Rudolf Steiner met in Dornach in 1924, she asked him “What should happen with my paintings? Should I burn them? Are they worth anything?” Rudolf Steiner replied that it would be a pity to let them be destroyed, that they are valuable. Later in life, af Klint made a decision to destroy all her correspondence. She left a collection of more than 1200 paintings and 125 diaries to her nephew, Erik af Klint. Among her last paintings, made in the 1930s, there are two watercolors presaging the events of World War II, titled The Blitz and The Fight in the Mediterranean.

Despite the popular belief that af Klint had determined to never exhibit her abstract works during her lifetime, in recent years, art historians such as Julia Voss have uncovered evidence that af Klint did attempt to show her work. Around 1920, in Dornach, Switzerland, af Klint met Dutch eurythmist Peggy Kloppers-Moltzer, who was also a member of The Anthroposophical Society. Later, the artist travelled to Amsterdam, where she and Kloppers discussed a possible exhibition with the editors of the art and architecture magazine Wendingen. Although the Amsterdam talks were not successful, at least one exhibition of af Klint's abstract works took place in London several years later, in 1928, at the World Conference on Spiritual Science in London, for which Kloppers was a member of the organizing committee. Originally, af Klint was excluded, but after Kloppers' insistence, she was added to the list of participants.

In July 1928, af Klint sailed from Stockholm to London, taking along some of her large-scale paintings. In her postcard to Anna Cassel (discovered in 2018), af Klint wrote that she was not alone during this four-day trip. Despite af Klint not having named her traveling companion, Julia Voss suggests that it was most likely Thomasine Andersson, an old friend from her De Fem days. Voss also suggests that it is probable that the works were from the Paintings for the Temple series.

In 1944, Hilma af Klint died at age 81 in Djursholm, Sweden, after a traffic accident. She had exhibited her work only a handful of times, for the most part at spiritual conferences and gatherings. She is buried at Galärvarvskyrkogården in Stockholm.

== Signature style ==
Af Klint's later period abstract art (1906–1920) delved into symbolism employing a combination of geometry, figuration, scientific research, and religious practices. Her studies of organic growth, including shells and flowers, infused her portrayals life through a spiritual lens.

Af Klint's individual or signature style was also marked with impressions from late 19th and early 20th century scientific discoveries as influenced by contemporary spiritual movements such as theosophy and anthroposophy. The notion of transcending the physical world and the constraints of representational art is visible in her abstract paintings. Britt Lundgren theorized that af Klint was influenced by the work of the scientist Thomas Young, whose writings were known to the Theosophists.

Af Klint's symbolic visual language has an ordered progression that reflects her understanding of grids, circles, spirals and petal-like forms—sometimes diagrammatic, sometimes biomorphic. Her paintings also explore the dichotomies she saw in the world. Spiral forms appear often in her art, as they do in the automatic drawings by De Fem. While every geometric form suggests growth, progress, and evolution, her color choices were also intended to be metaphorical in nature. As one of the Proto-Feminist Artists, her style represents the sublime in art.

== Personal life ==
Hilma af Klint never married, lived only with women, and prioritized deep friendships with them. She left no diary entries or letters that suggest romantic relationships. Modern speculation is that she was queer or lesbian, and that her paintings and views on androgyny and gender fluidity show queer sensibility. Af Klint's decision to keep her work secret for twenty years after her death has prompted comparisons with Emily Dickinson.

== Legacy ==
=== Estate ===
In her will, Hilma af Klint left all her abstract paintings to her nephew, Vice Admiral Erik af Klint of the Royal Swedish Navy. She specified that her work should be kept secret for at least twenty years after her death. When the boxes were opened at the end of the 1960s, very few persons had knowledge of what would be revealed.

In 1970, her paintings were offered as a gift to Moderna Museet i Stockholm, but the donation was declined. Erik af Klint then donated thousands of drawings and paintings to a foundation bearing the artist's name. Thanks to the art historian Åke Fant, her art was introduced to an international audience in the 1980s, when he presented her at a Nordik conference in Helsinki in 1984.

The collection of abstract paintings of Hilma af Klint includes more than 1200 pieces, owned and managed by the Hilma af Klint Foundation in Stockholm, Sweden. In 2017, Norwegian architectural firm Snøhetta presented plans for an exhibition space dedicated to af Klint in Järna, south of Stockholm, with estimated building costs of €6 to 7.5 million. In February 2018, the Foundation signed a longterm agreement of cooperation with the Moderna Museet, where her works had been refused less than forty years earlier, thereby confirming the permanence of the Hilma af Klint Room as a space at the museum where a dozen works of the artist are shown on a continuous basis.

Af Klint's work was included in the 2021 exhibition Women in Abstraction at the Centre Pompidou.

=== Art market ===
In 2026, Hilma af Klint's abstract paining Ser III No. 5 (1920) sold at auction house Bukowskis in Stockholm for $12.7 million with fees, setting a record for the artist.

== Cultural references ==
- Hilma af Klint and her work are presented in the 2016 film Personal Shopper, in which the main character, played by Kristen Stewart, researches art inspired by spirits.
- The work of Hilma af Klint is cited by Jane Weaver as inspiration for Modern Kosmology (2017).
- Af Klint was the subject of a 2019 feature-length documentary by German director Halina Dyrschka, titled Beyond the Visible – Hilma af Klint.
- Hilma – an Opera about Hidden Art (2019) is a chamber opera composed by Swedish composer Benjamin Staern with libretto and direction by Mira Bartov that was performed at Moderna Museet, Stockholm and Solomon R. Guggenheim Museum in New York, where the opera deals with the complex relationship between Hilma and Rudolf Steiner.
- Af Klint's work is presented in the 2020 short film Point and Line to Plane, written and directed by Sofia Bohdanowicz. The short features the Solomon R. Guggenheim Museum's 2018 exhibition Hilma Af Klint: Paintings for the Future, which is seen in mid-installation.
- Af Klint's work can be seen in Episode 4, Season 1 (2021) of The Madame Blanc Mysteries.
- Hilma (2022) is an English-language Swedish biographical film directed by Lasse Hallström, and starring his wife Lena Olin and their daughter Tora Hallström as Hilma.
- Af Klint's work is presented in the 2024 Amazon Prime movie Upgraded, directed by Carlson Young. The main character, played by Camila Mendes, is an ignored but ambitious intern in the New York art world whose life and career take a turn when, by happenstance, she is upgraded to first class on a flight to London.
- Hilma, a 2024 opera by librettist Kate Scelsa and composer Robert M. Johanson and directed by Morgan Green that premiered in Philadelphia.

== Exhibitions (posthumous) ==
- "Hilma Af Klint: Paintings for the Future", the Solomon R. Guggenheim Museum's 2019 exhibition, had over 600,000 visitors, the most-visited exhibition in the museum's 60-year history.
- "Hilma af Klint: The Secret Paintings", City Gallery Wellington 2021 exhibition.
- "Hilma af Klint & Piet Mondrian: Forms of Life", Tate Modern, London. 2023.
- "Hilma af Klint and Wassily Kandinsky. Dreams of the Future." K20 Kunstsammlung Nordrhein-Westfalen, Düsseldorf, Germany. 2024.
- "Hilma af Klint: What Stands Behind the Flowers", Museum of Modern Art, New York City, 2025.
- "Hilma af Klint", Grand Palais, Paris, 2026.

=== Selected exhibitions ===
- De geheime schilderijen van Hilma af Klint, Museum voor Moderne Kunst, Arnhem, Netherlands. 7 March 2010 – 30 May 2010
- Hilma af Klint – a Pioneer of Abstraction was produced by and showed at Moderna Museet i Stockholm, Sweden, from 16 February until 26 May 2013, before touring to Hamburger Bahnhof – Museum für Gegenwart in Berlin, Germany, from 15 June to 6 October; Museo Picasso Málaga, Spain, from 21 October 2013 to 9 February 2014; Louisiana Museum of Modern Art, Humblebaek, Copenhaguen, Denmark 2014; Henie Onstad Kunstsenter, Oslo, Norway 2015; Kumu, Tallinn, Estonia 2015
- Works by af Klint were exhibited at the Central Pavilion of the 55th Venice Biennale, Italy. 1 June – 24 November 2013.

== Gallery ==
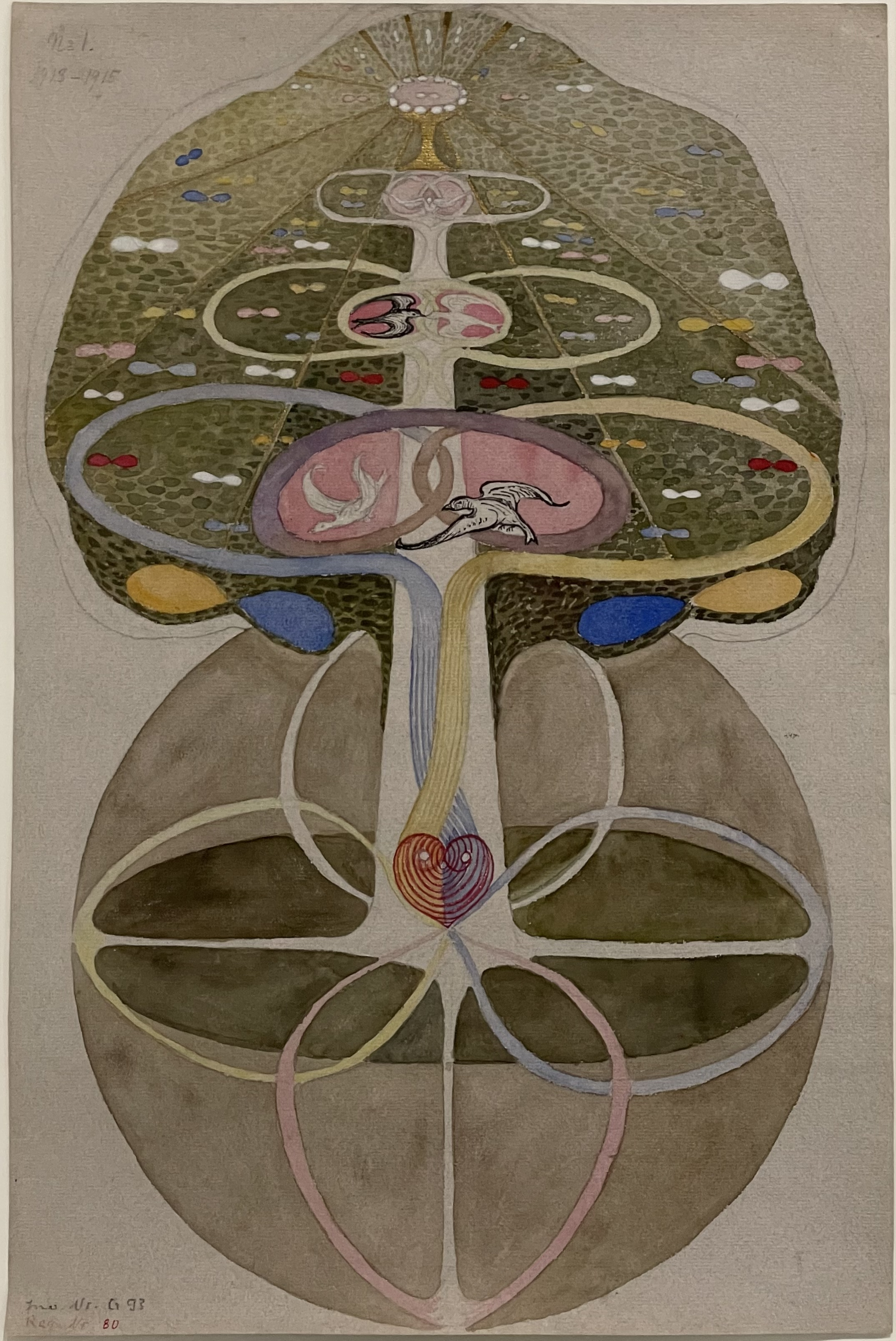
Tree of Knowledge, No. 1, 1913–1915

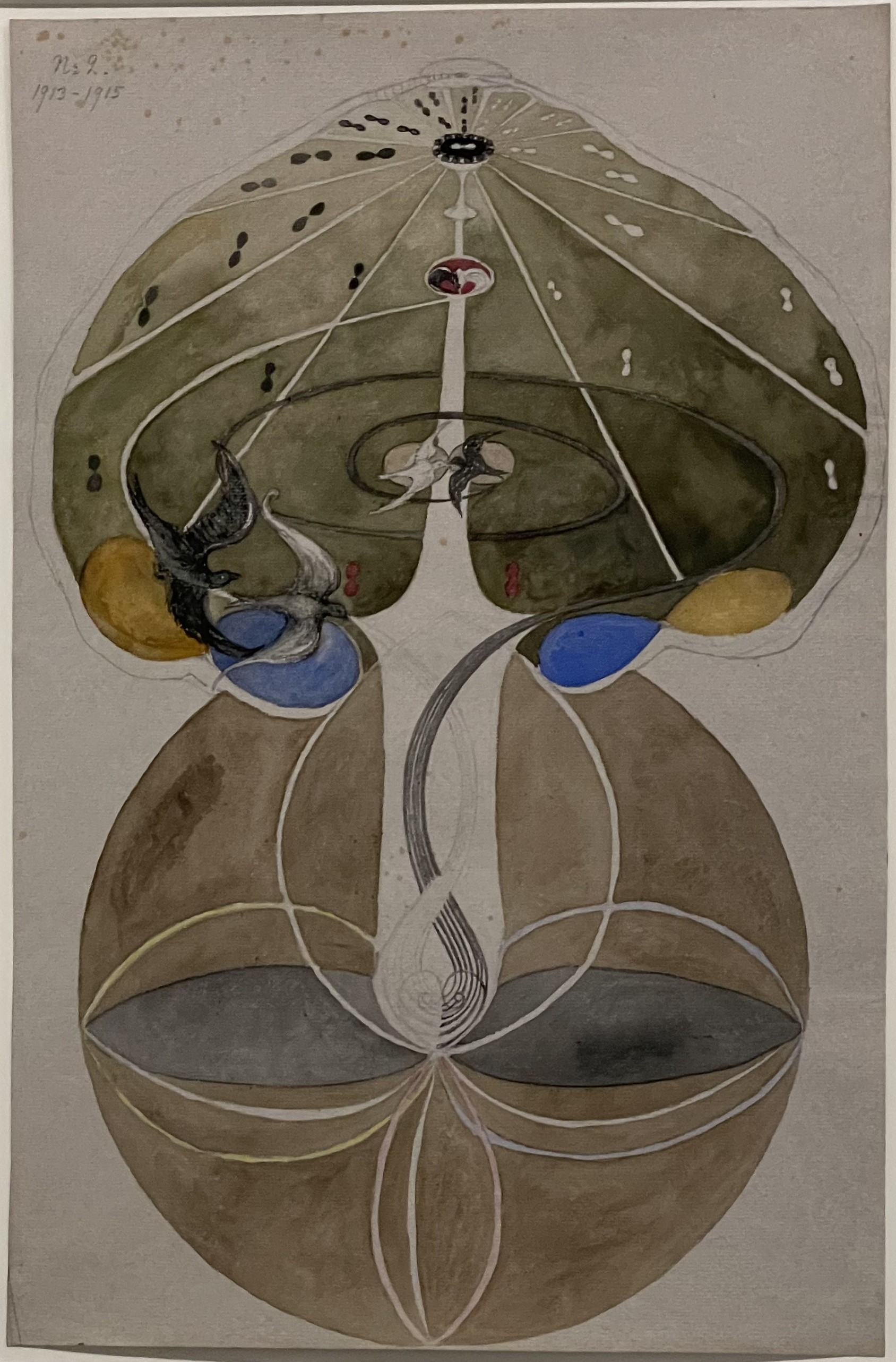
Tree of Knowledge, No. 2, 1913–1915

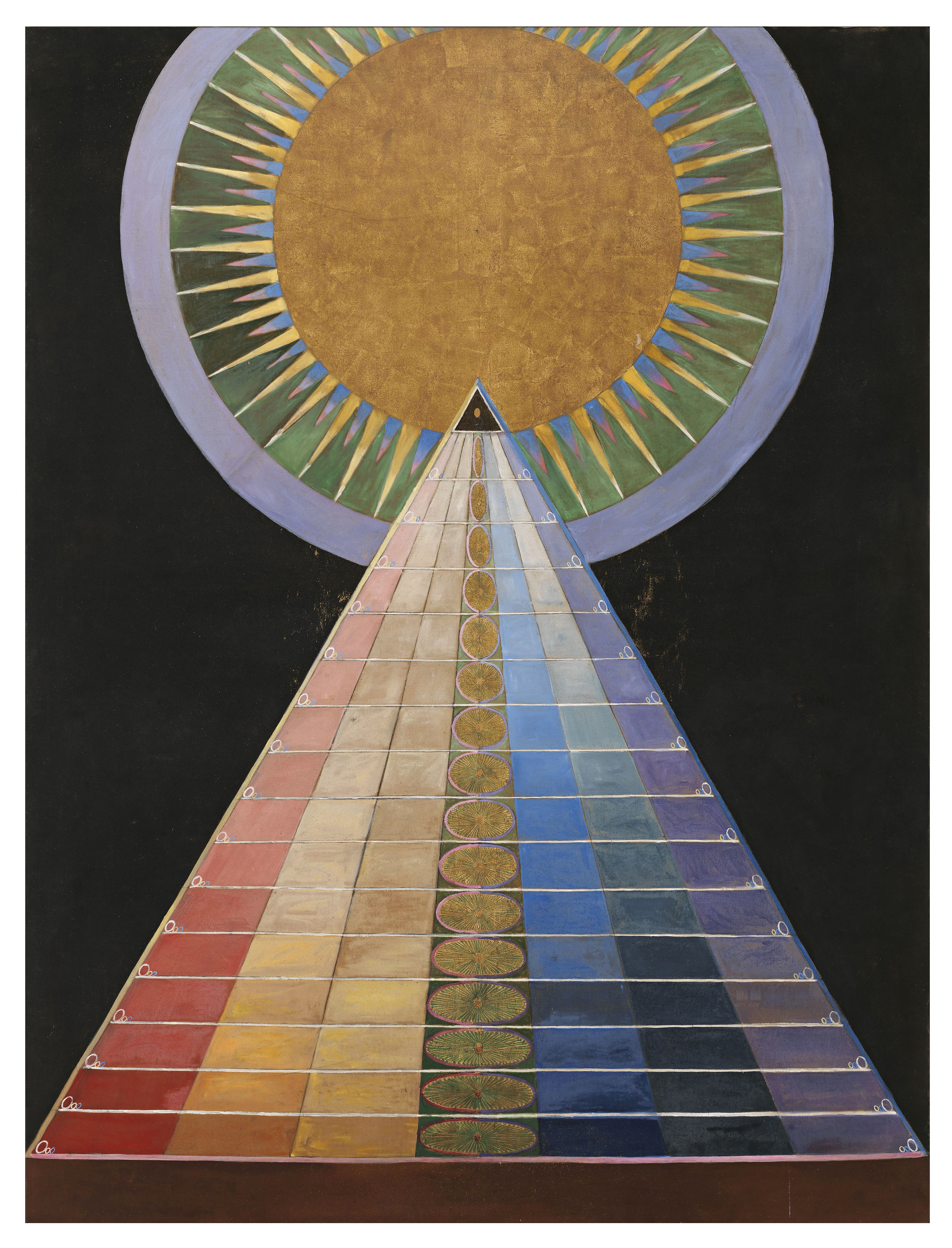
Group X, No. 1, Altarpiece, 1915

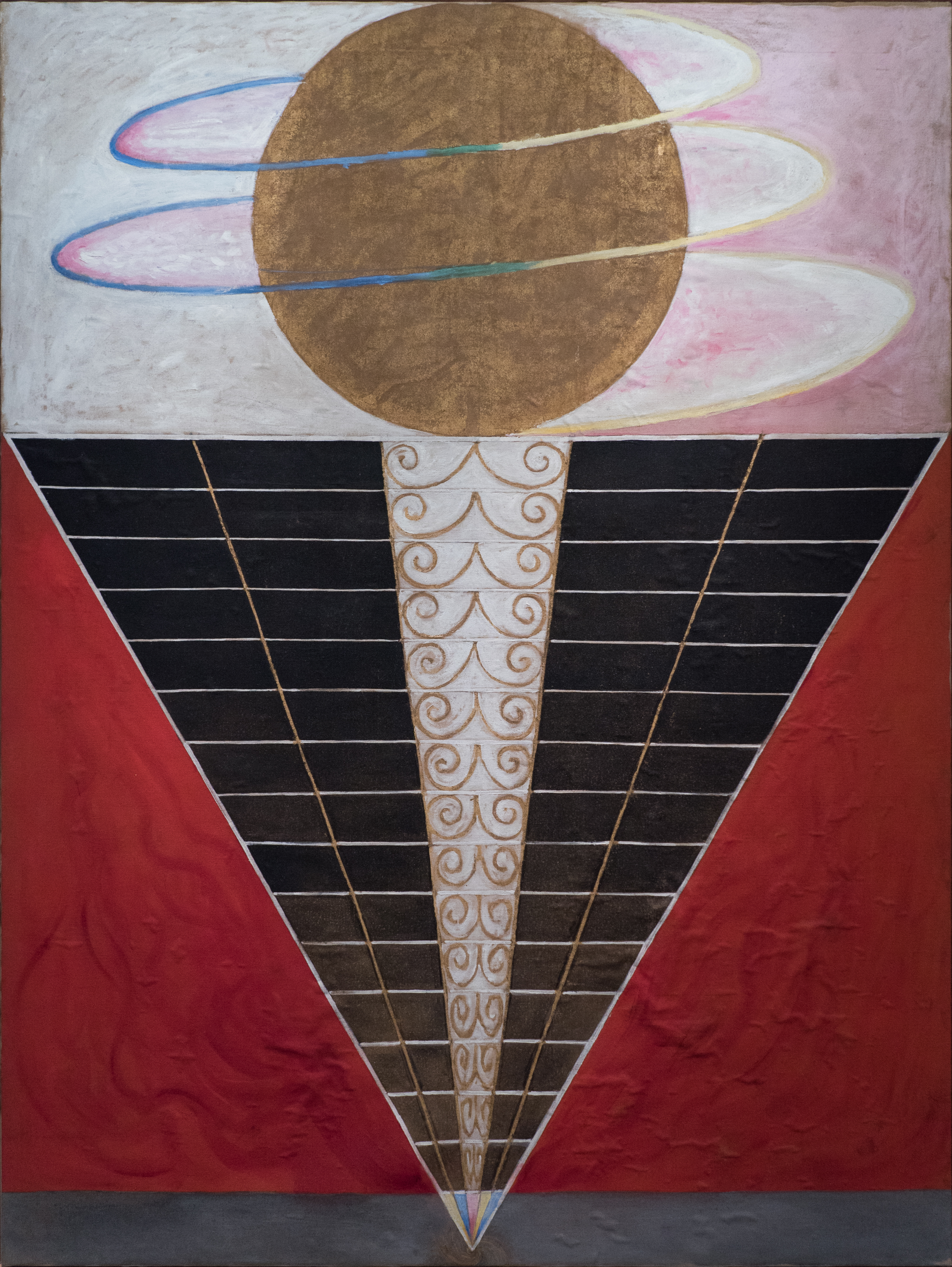
Group X, No. 2, Altarpiece, 1915

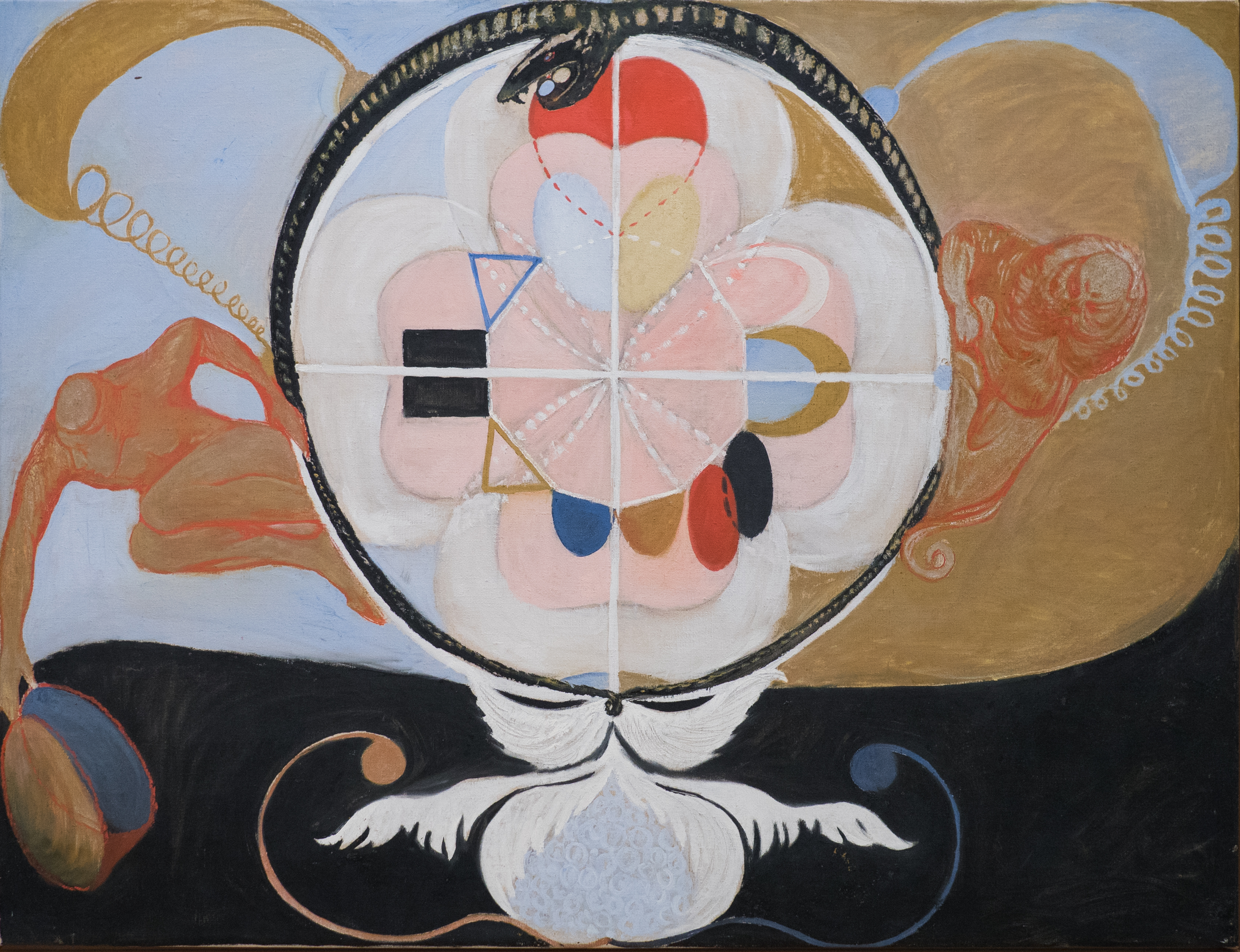
Evolution, No. 13, Group VI, 1908

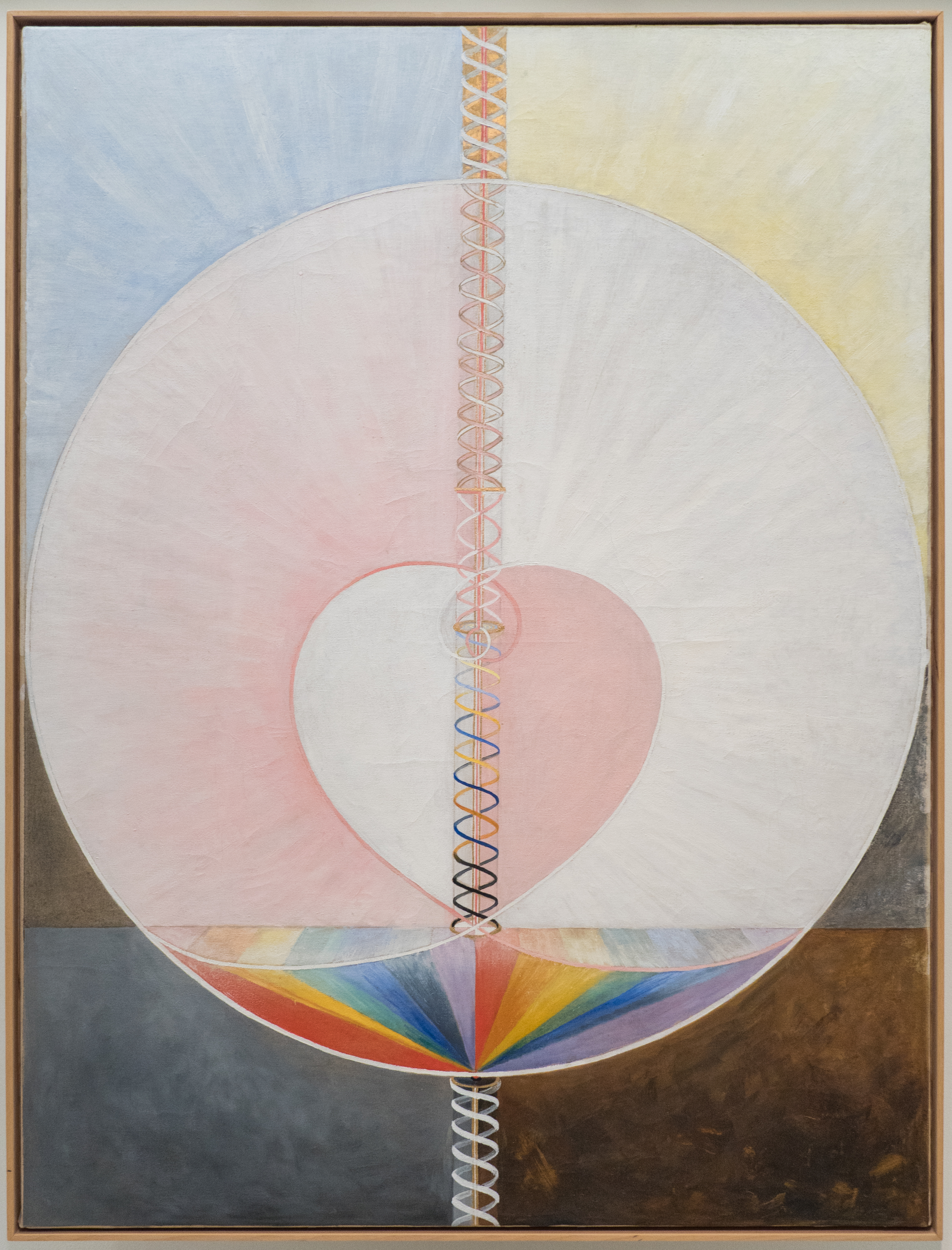
Group IX/UW, No. 25, The Dove, No. 1, 1915

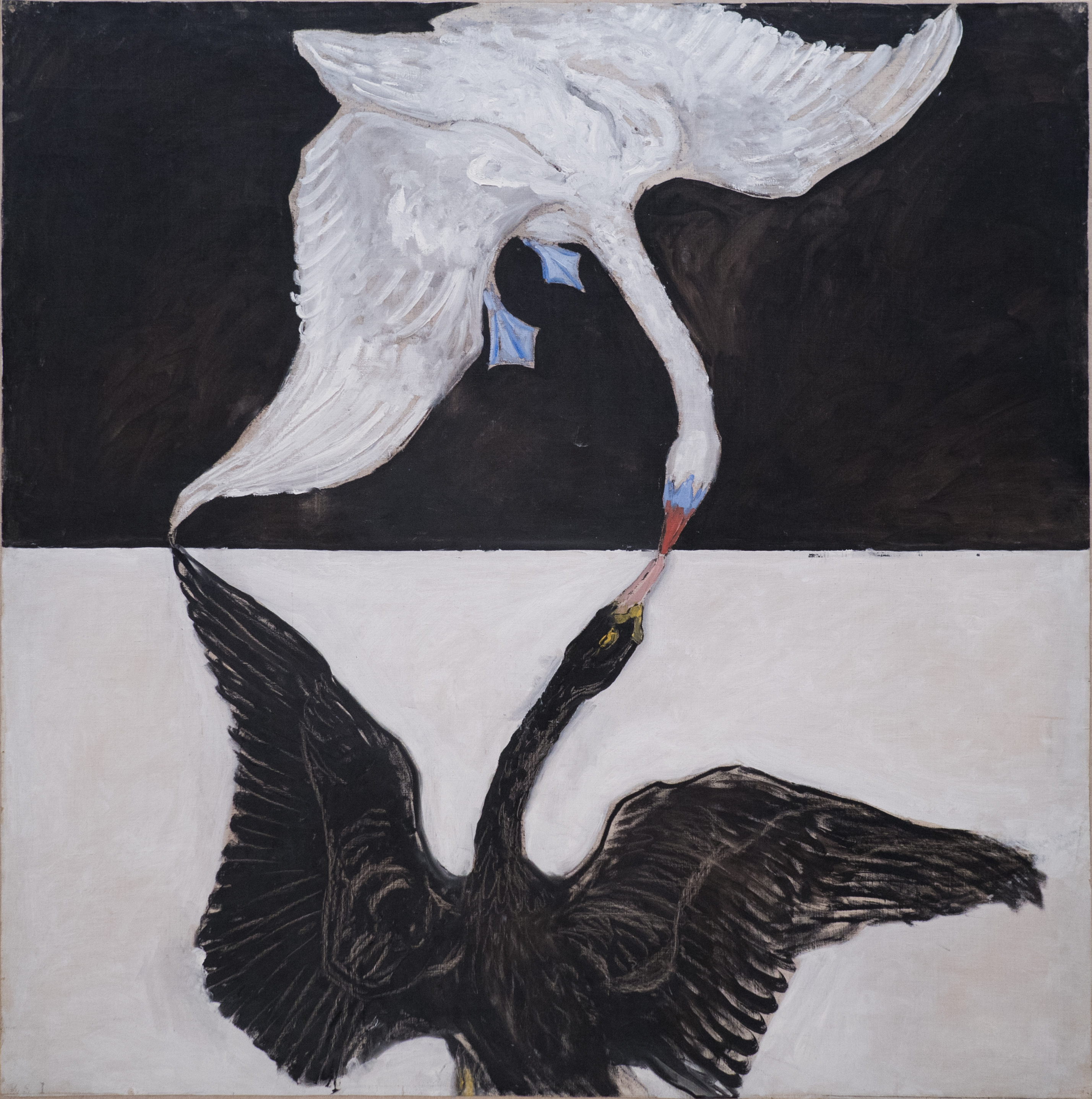
Group IX/SUW, The Swan, No. 1, 1915

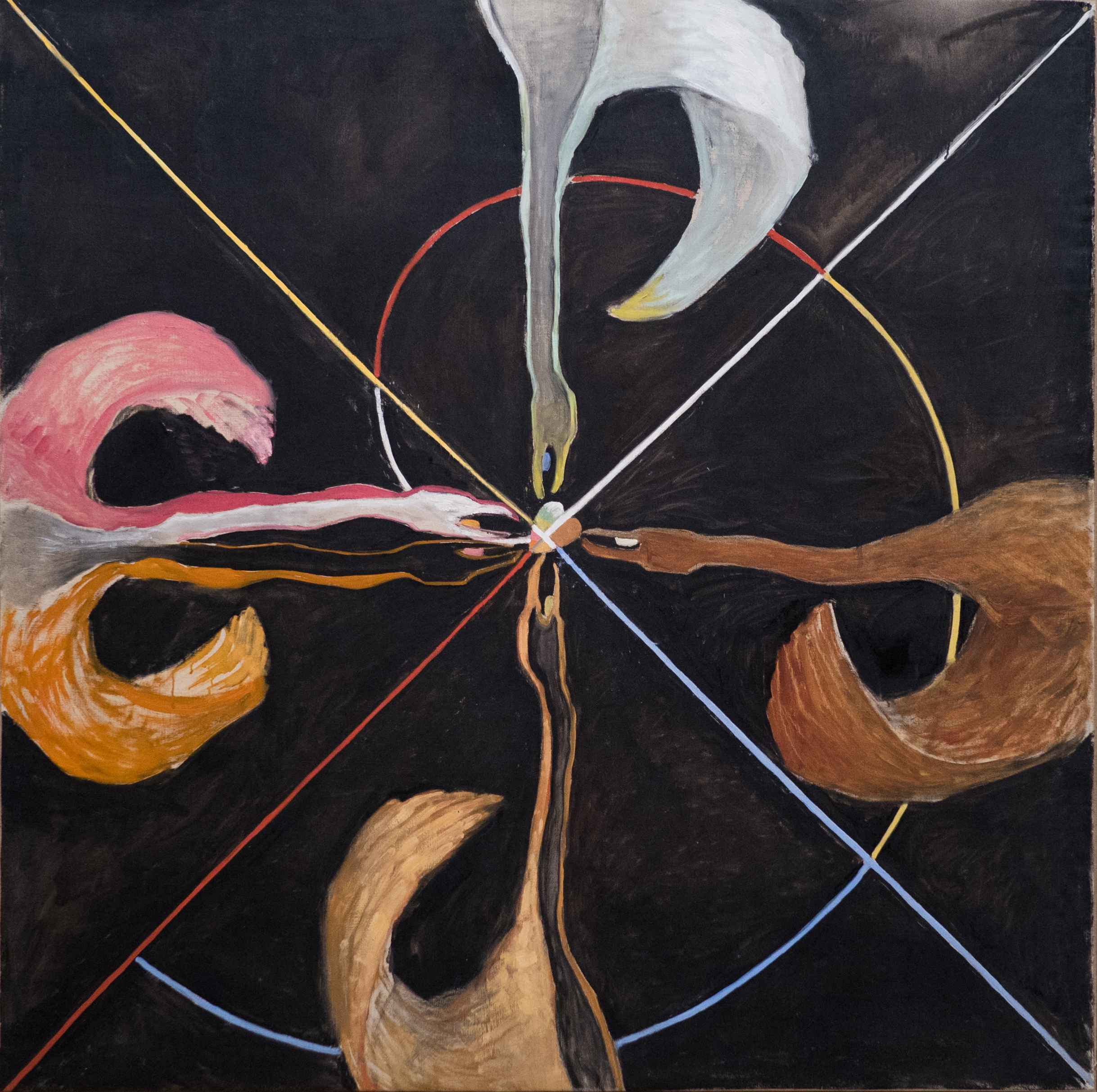
Group IX/SUW, The Swan, No. 7, 1915

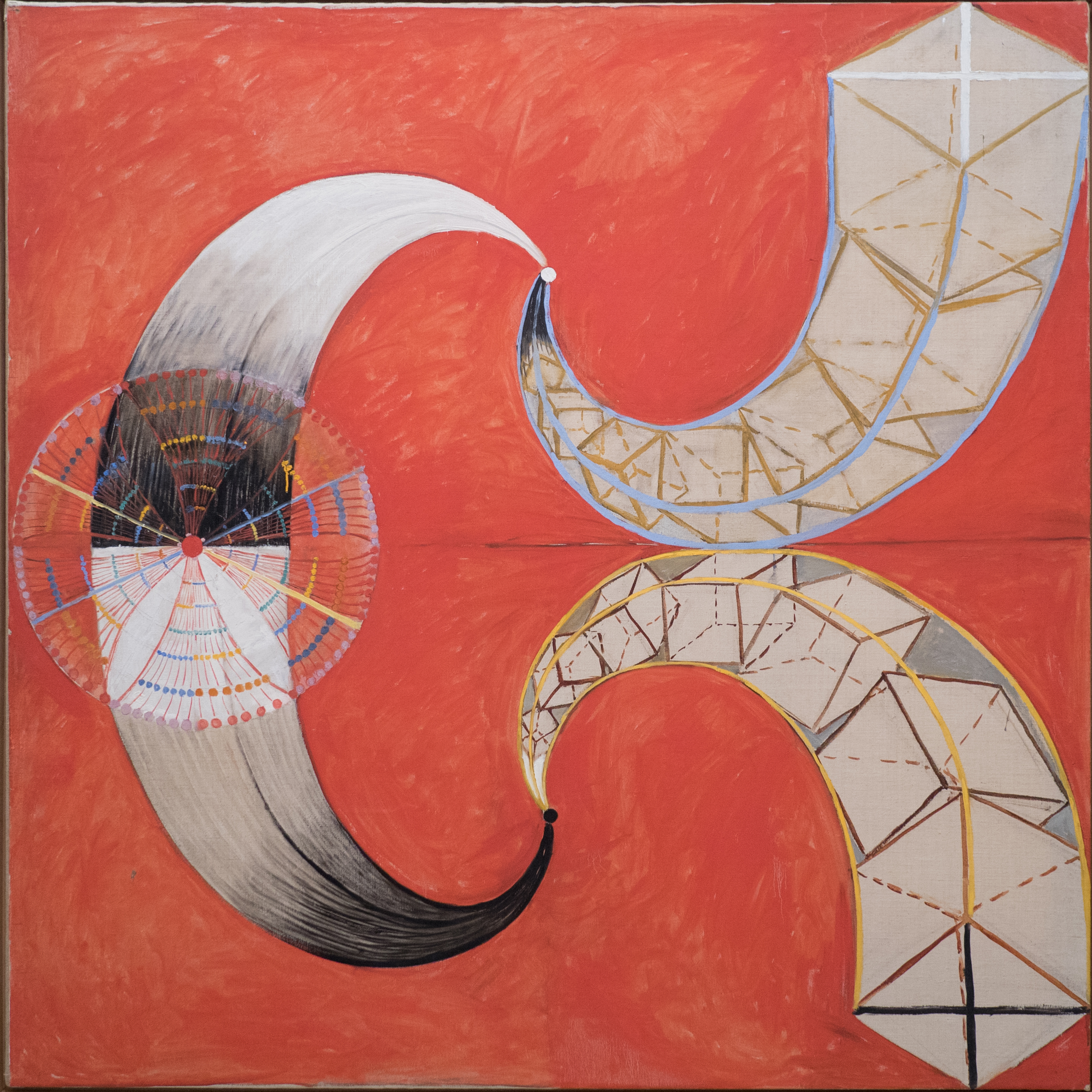
Group IX/SUW, The Swan, No. 9, 1915

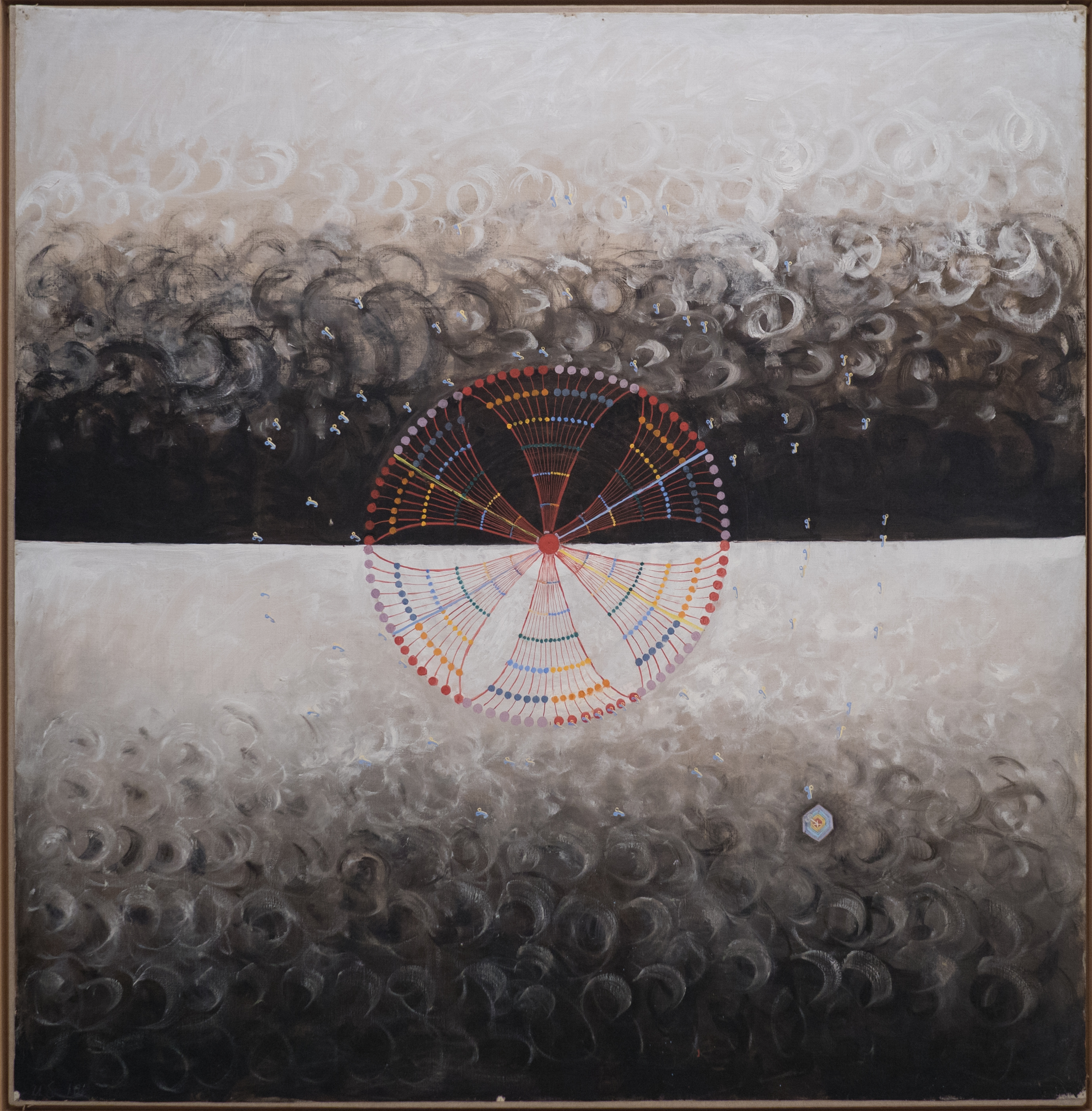
The Swan, No. 10, Group IX/SUW, 1915

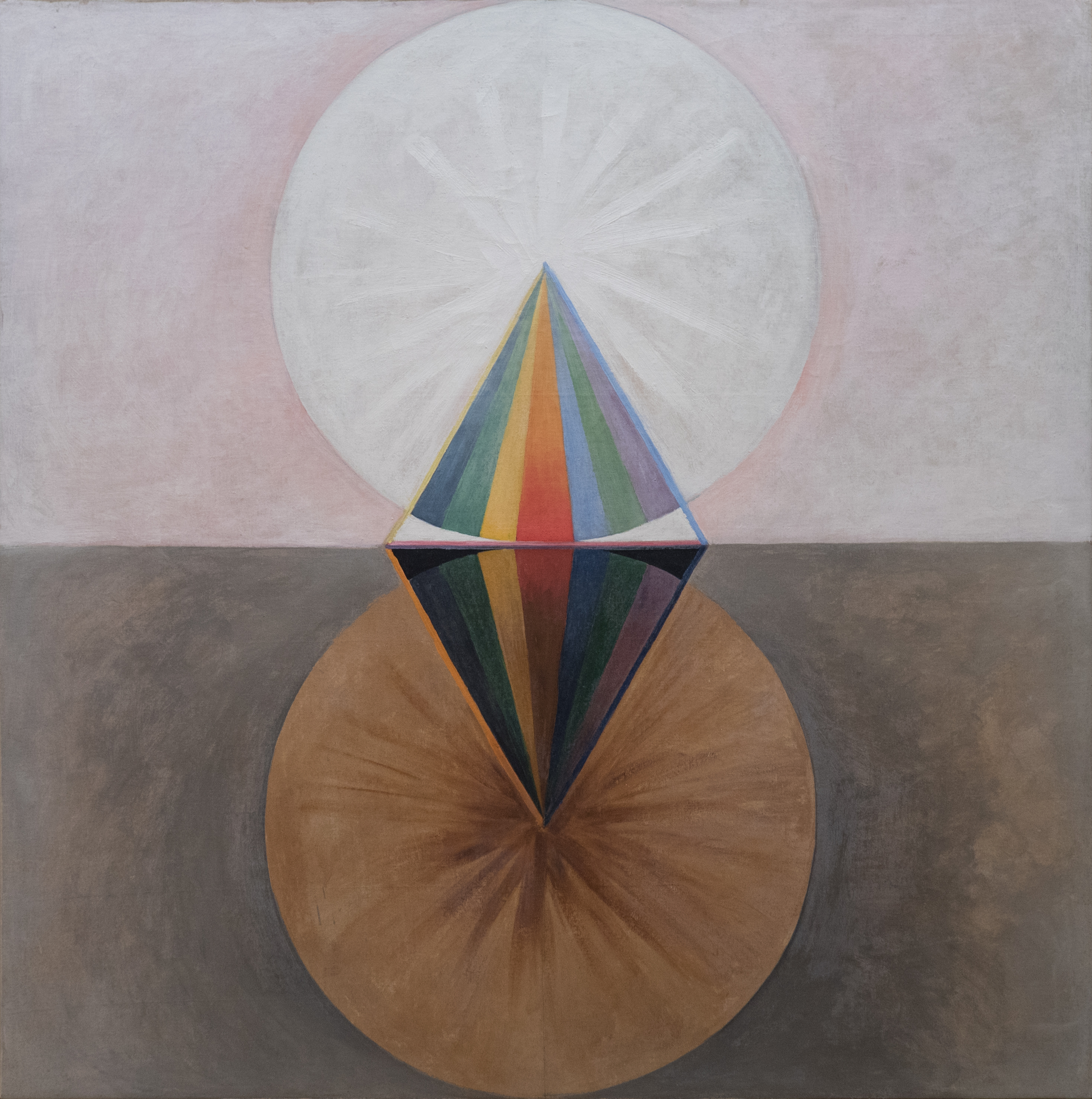
The Swan, No. 12, Group IX/SUW, 1915

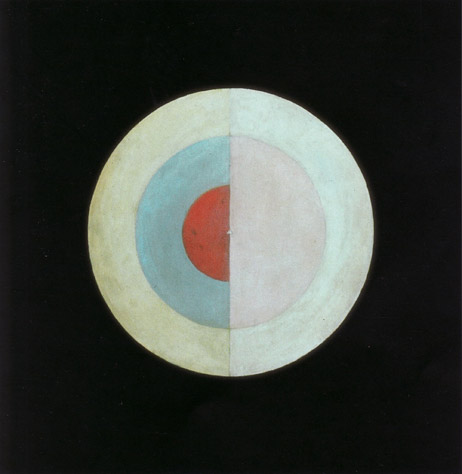
The Swan, No. 16, Group IX/SUW, 1915

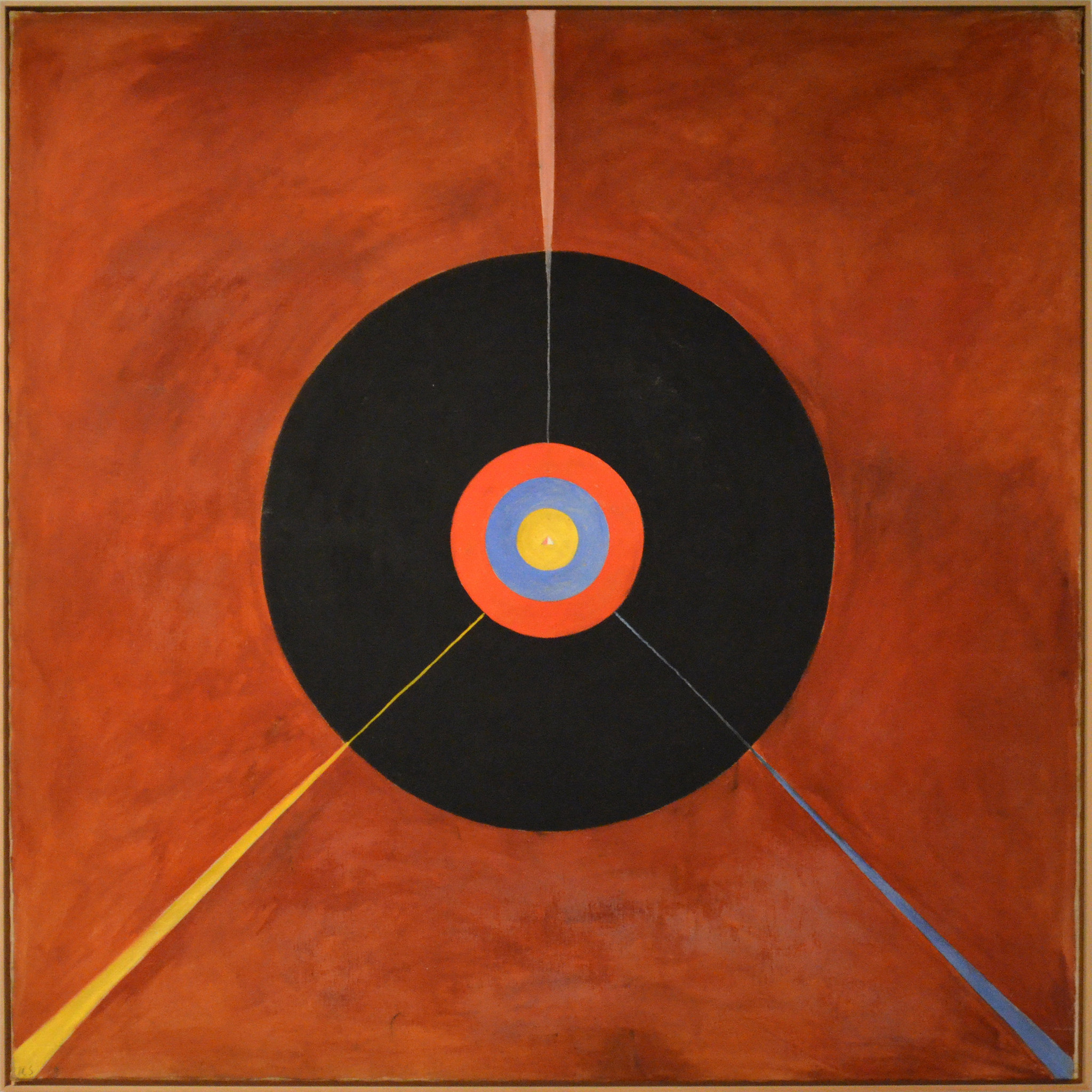
The Swan, No. 18, Group IX/SUW, 1915

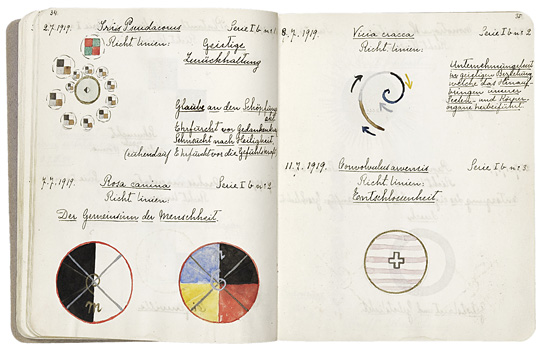
Notebook, 2–11 July 1919

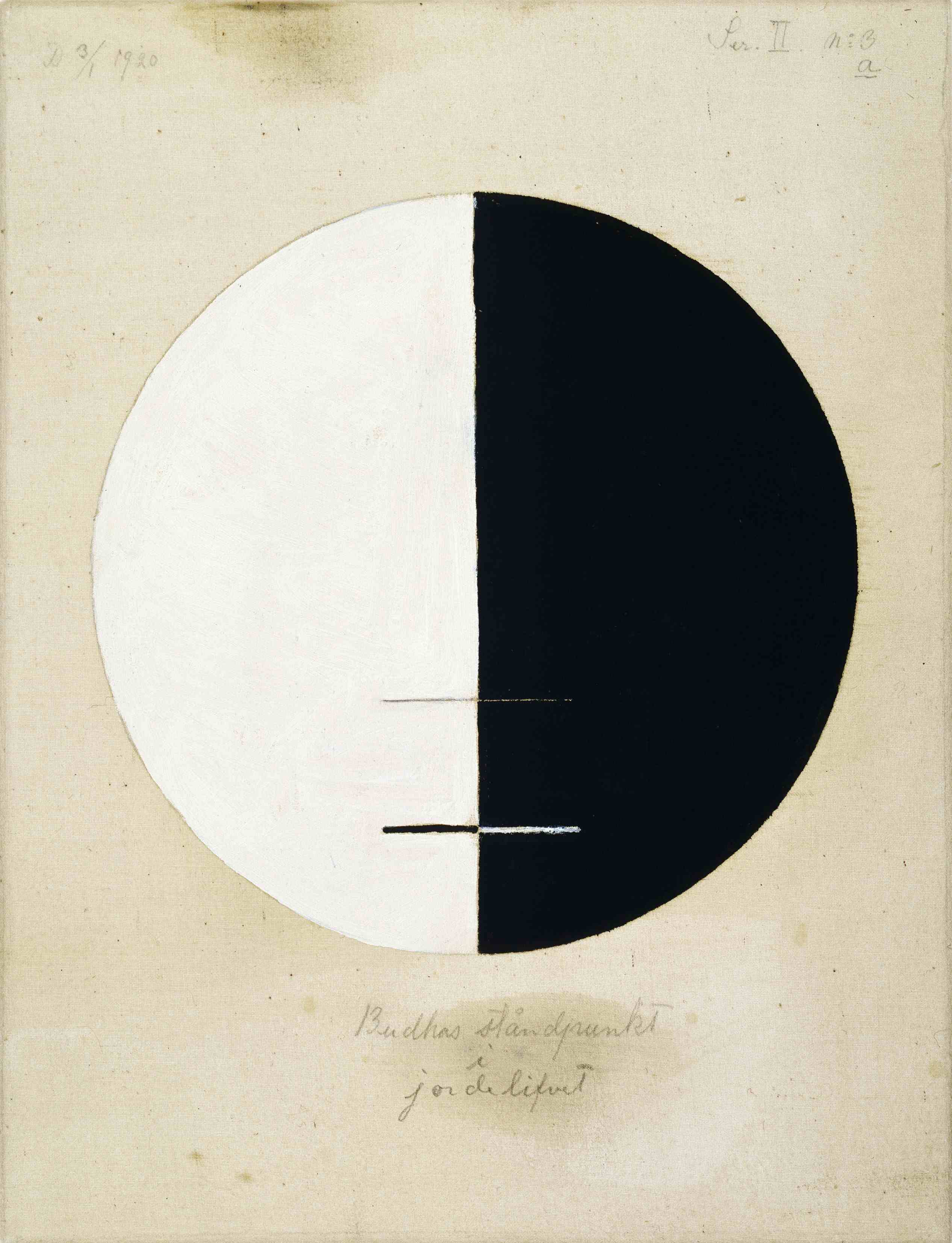
Buddha's Standpoint in the Earthly Life, No. 3a, Series XI, 1920

== See also ==
- Hilma af Klint and Theosophy

== Publications ==
- HILMA AF KLINT: Catalogue Raisonné, Bokförlaget Stolpe, Vol. I–VII, 27 December 2022, ISBN 919852366X
- The Spiritual in Art, Abstract Painting 1890–1985, publ. Los Angeles County Museum of Art, 1986. ISBN 0-89659-669-9, 0-87587130-5 LACMA : pbk
- Hilma af Klint, Raster Förlag, Stockholm. Swedish text, about 100 pictures. ISBN 91-87214-08-3 (in Swedish)
- Vägen till templet, Rosengårdens Förlag. Swedish text, 30 sketches. Describes the teaching period to become a medium. ISBN 91-972883-0-6 (in Swedish)
- Enheten bortom mångfalden, Rosengårdens Förlag. Swedish text, 32 pictures. Two parts, one philosophical and one art-scientific. ISBN 91-972883-4-9 (in Swedish)
- I describe the way and meanwhile I am proceeding along it, Rosengårdens Förlag. A short introduction in English with 3 pictures. ISBN 91-972883-2-2
- 3 X Abstraction, Catherine de Zegher and Hendel Teicher (eds.), Yale University Press and The Drawing Center, New York, 2005 ISBN 978-0300108262, 0300108265
- Okkultismus und Abstraktion, die Malerin Hilma af Klint, Åke Fant, Albertina, Wien 1992, ISBN 3-900656-17-7. (in German)
- Mod Lyset – Belyj, Goethe, Hilma af Klint, Jeichau, Kandinsky, Martinus, Rosenkrantz, Steiner Gl. Holtegaard & Nordjyllands Kunstmuseum. 2004. ISBN 87-884995-2-9 (in Danish)
- Hilma af Klint, the Greatness of Things, John Hutchinson (ed.), Douglas Hyde Gallery, Dublin 2005. English text, 23 images. ISBN 0-907660-99-1.
- The Message. Art and Occultism. With an Essay by André Breton. Hrsg. v. Claudia Dichter, Hans Günter Golinski, Michael Krajewski, Susanne Zander. Kunstmuseum Bochum. Walther König: Köln 2007, ISBN 978-3-86560-342-5.
- Swedish Women Artists: Sigrid Hjertén, Hilma af Klint, Nathalie Djurberg, Signe Hammarsten-Jansson, Aleksandra Mir, Ulrika Pasch, Books LCC, 2010. ISBN 978-1155646084
- The Legacy of Hilma af Klint: Nine Contemporary Responses (English / German), Ann-Sofi Norin, Daniel Birnbaum, Verlag der Buchhandlung Walther König, 2013. ASIN B00FOT4GAM
- Hilma af Klint. The Art of Seeing the Invisible, by Kurt Belfrage, Louise Almqvist (eds.), 2015 ASIN B01K3I9A1S
- Hilma af Klint – A Pioneer of Abstraction, edited by Iris Müller-Westermann with Jo Widoff, with contributions by David Lomas, Pascal Rousseau and Helmut Zander, exhibition catalogue of Moderna Museet nr. 375, 2013. ISBN 978-91-8624-348-7
- Hilma af Klint – Painting the Unseen, edited by Daniel Birnbaum and Emma Enderby, with contributions by Julia Peyton-Jones, Hans Ulrich Obrist, Jennifer Higgie and Julia Voss. Serpentine Galleries / Koenig Books, 2016. ISBN 978-1-908617-34-7
- Hilma – en roman om gåtan Hilma af Klint [Hilma – a novel about the enigma Hilma af Klint], Anna Laestadius Larsson, ed. Piratförlaget, 24 May 2017 ISBN 978-91-642-0489-9 (in Swedish)
- Hilma af Klint – Seeing is Believing, Kurt Almqvist and Louise Belfrage, Buchhandlung Walther König, 7 October 2017 ISBN 9783960981183
- Ni vues, Ni connues pp. 42–44, Collectif Georgette Sand, Publisher Hugo Doc collection Les Simone, 5 October 2017 ISBN 9782755635393 (in French)
- Hilma af Klint: Notes and Methods, with an introduction and commentary by Iris Müller-Westerman, University of Chicago Press, 2018 ISBN 978-0-226-59193-3
- Hilma af Klint & Piet Mondrian: Forms of Life, ed. Nadia Abdel Nabi, Briony Fer and Laura Stamps, Tate Publishing, 2023 ISBN 978-1-84976-845-0
- Hilma af Klint: What Stands Behind the Flowers, edited by Jodi Hauptman, The Museum of Modern Art, New York, 2025. ISBN 978-1633451681
