= Mathilda Nilsson =

Swedish artist (1844–1923)

Emma Mathilda Nilsson (née Cederberg; July 13, 1844 – June 28, 1923) was a Swedish spiritualist from Stockholm.

== Spiritualism ==
Nilsson was a high-profile within the spiritualistic society in Stockholm. She was one of the first members of the spiritualistic organisation "Spiritistiska Litteraturföreningen" from its founding in 1877.

Nilsson was member of "Klöverbladet" and one of the founders of the Edelweiss Society in Stockholm, founded in December 1888. She was a very active member of the Society, where she took notes of messages received from spirits, healed through laying on of hands and received messages from the dead. She left the Edelweiss Society in 1896.

1891 she became editor of the spiritualistic magazine "Efteråt? Tidskrift för spiritism och därmed beslägtade ämnen" [Afterwards? Journal of Spiritualism and related topics], which was the main publication for spiritualism in Sweden. The magazine was issued during the period 1891–1922 and had its editorial offices in her home at Kammakargatan.

In 1904, Nilsson became member of the Stockholm lodge of the Theosophical Society.

Nilsson was one of the five members of De fem, a spiritualistic group founded in 1896, and dissolved in 1907, with several of its members moving on to collaborate with Hilma af Klint for the Paintings for the Temple. The artists Hilma af Klint, Anna Cassel, Sigrid Hedman and Cornelia Cederberg (Nilsson's sister) were the other four members.

During group's séances, spirit leaders presented themselves by name and promised to help the group's members in their spiritual training. The spirits communicating with the five women were mostly Gregor, Georg, Clemens, Ananda och Amaliel. Such leaders are common in spiritualist literature and life.

== Graphical drawings ==
Through their spiritual guidance, Cornelia Cederberg, Hilma af Klint and Anna Cassel was inspired to draw automatically in pencil, a technique that was not unusual at that time. When the hand moved automatically, the conscious will did not direct the pattern that developed on the paper, and, in theory, the women thus became artistic tools for their spirit leaders. This technique, called automatism was used a decade later by the Surrealists.

In a series of sketchbooks, religious scenes and symbols were depicted in drawings made by the group collectively. Their drawing technique developed in such a way that abstract patterns—dependent on the free movement of the hand—became visible.

== Personal life ==
She was married to Anders Nilsson, with whom she took care of her niece, Elisabet Cederberg.

They lived at Kammarkargatan 6 in Stockholm, in the same house as her sister Cornelia Cederberg, and her brother Carl Cederberg, the father of the child Elisabet.
