= Cornelia Cederberg =

Cornelia Carolina Amalia Cederberg (born on 6 November 1854 in Stockholm, died 21 February 1933 in Stockholm, was one of the members of the group De Fem (The five), a spiritualistic group founded in 1896 and dissolved in 1907.

The other members the group De Fem (The five) were Hilma af Klint, Anna Cassel, Sigrid Hedman and Mathilda Nilsson (Cornelia Cederberg's sister). It began as an ordinary spiritualist group that received messages through a psychograph (an instrument for recording spirit writings) or a trance medium.

During group's séances spirit leaders presented themselves by name and promised to help the group's members in their spiritual training. The spirits communicating with the five women were mostly Gregor, Georg, Clemens, Ananda och Amaliel. Such leaders are common in spiritualist literature and life. Through their spiritual guidance, the group was inspired to draw automatically in pencil, a technique that was not unusual at that time. When the hand moved automatically, the conscious will did not direct the pattern that developed on the paper, and, in theory, the women thus became artistic tools for their spirit leaders. This technique, called automatism was used a decade later by the Surrealists.

In a series of sketchbooks, religious scenes, and symbols were depicted in drawings made by the group collectively. Their drawing technique developed in such a way that abstract patterns—dependent on the free movement of the hand—became visible.

The group De Fem ceased to meet in 1907. Several of its members went over to collaborate with Hilma af Klint for the Paintings for the Temple.
