= Sigrid Hedman =

Sigrid Elisabeth Hedman (née Norman; April 26, 1855 in Stockholm – February 28, 1922 in Solna) was one of the members of the group De Fem (The five), a spiritualist group founded in 1896 and dissolved in 1907.

== Biography ==
Hedman was an early member of the Edelweiss Society in Stockholm. She was interested in spiritualism and had mediumistic gifts. In 1900 she published an article in the magazine Efteråt? Tidskrift för spiritism och därmed beslägtade ämnen ('Afterwards? Journal of Spiritualism and related topics'), which was the main publication for spiritualism in Sweden. In the article she defended spiritualism, pointing out how straining it was for the medium to get in touch with higher beings.

The other members of the group De Fem (The five) were Hilma af Klint, Anna Cassel, Mathilda Nilsson and Cornelia Cederberg (Mathilda Nilsson's sister). It began as an ordinary spiritualist group that received messages through a psychograph (an instrument for recording spirit writings) or a trance medium. Hedman was the medium within the group, as she was the one receiving the messages from the spirits.

During group's séances spirit leaders presented themselves by name and promised to help the group's members in their spiritual training. The spirits communicating with the five women were mostly Gregor, Georg, Clemens, Ananda and Amaliel. Such leaders are common in spiritualist literature and life. Through their spiritural guidance, the group was inspired to draw automatically in pencil, a technique that was not unusual at that time. When the hand moved automatically, the conscious will did not direct the pattern that developed on the paper, and, in theory, the women thus became artistic tools for their spirit leaders. This technique, called automatism, was used a decade later by the Surrealists.

In a series of sketchbooks, religious scenes and symbols were depicted in drawings made by the group collectively. Their drawing technique developed in such a way that abstract patterns – dependent on the free movement of the hand – became visible.

The group De Fem ceased to meet in 1907. Several of its members went on to collaborate with Hilma af Klint on the Paintings for the Temple.

== Personal life ==
Sigrid Hedman was married to the wholesaler Ernst Hedman (1853–1938). They had five children, born 1884–1889.
