= Blanch's Café =

Café in Stockholm, Sweden

Coordinates: 59°19′56.9″N 18°4′11.6″E

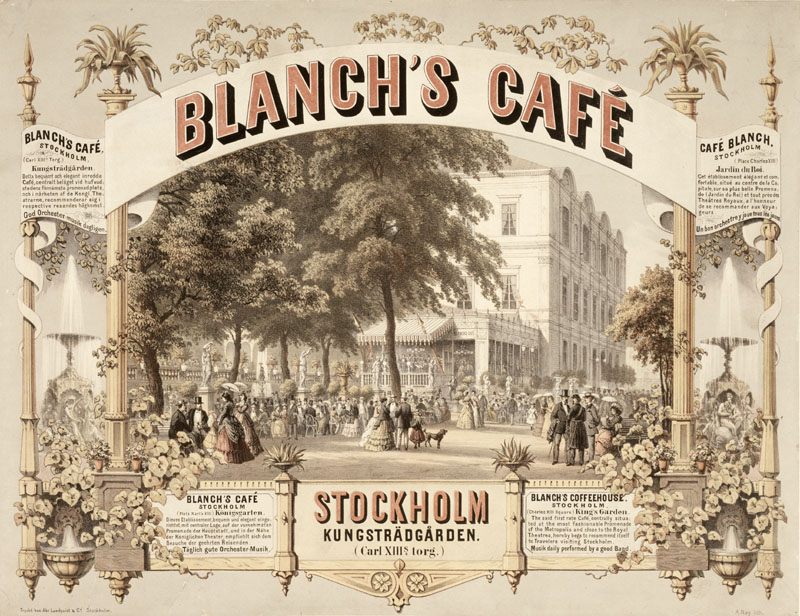
Poster from the 1870s

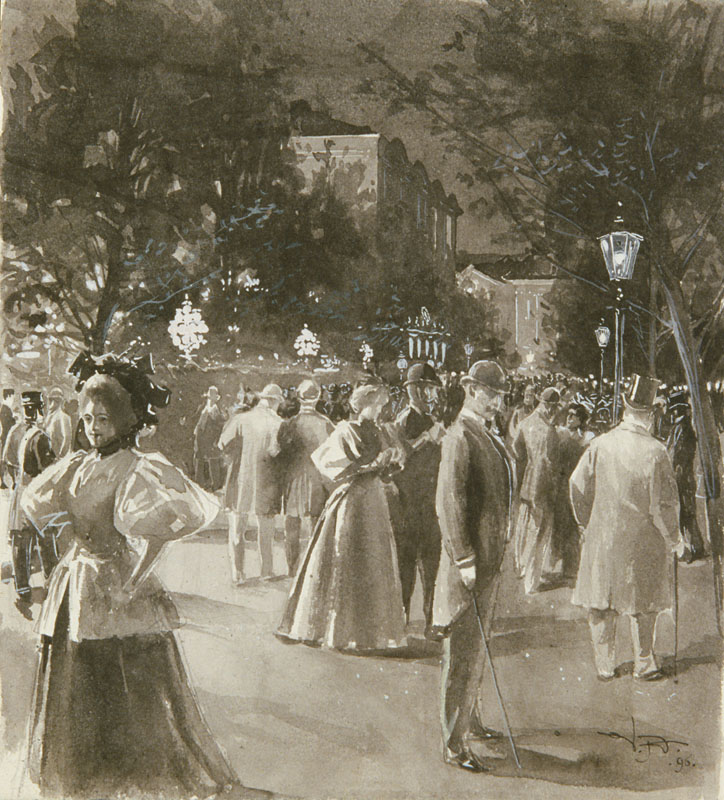
Nightlife outside Blanch's Café, 1896 by Victor Andrén

Blanch's Café was a café in Stockholm, Sweden, located in a now demolished building on Hamngatan.

The house that houses the establishment was built in 1866 according to plans of the architect Albert Törnqvist and was originally intended to house an exhibition and create studio space with large windows in the building's upper floors. The Art Society in Stockholm moved into the premises on 1868. However, Governor Theodore Blanch (1835–1911) opened Blanch's cafe on the ground floor in July 1868. The interior was elegant and airy, with crystal chandeliers, plush carpets and comfortable chairs.

Live music was played every afternoon and foreign newspapers were laid out in the dining room. The building was replaced in the 1960s by Sverigehuset (Sweden House).
