= Georg Trakl =

Austrian poet (1887–1914)

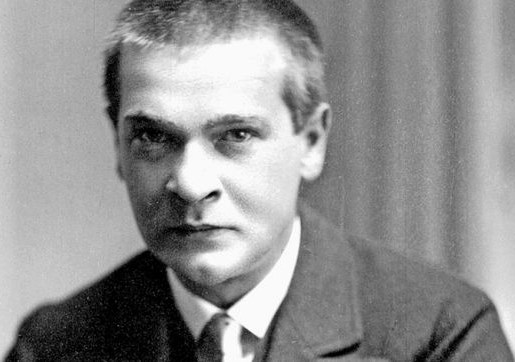
- Born: 3 February 1887; Salzburg, Duchy of Salzburg, Austria-Hungary (now Austria)
- Died: 3 November 1914 (aged 27); Kraków, Kingdom of Galicia and Lodomeria, Austria-Hungary (now Poland)
- Education: University of Vienna
- Occupations: Poet, pharmacist, writer
- Writing career
- Movement: Expressionism

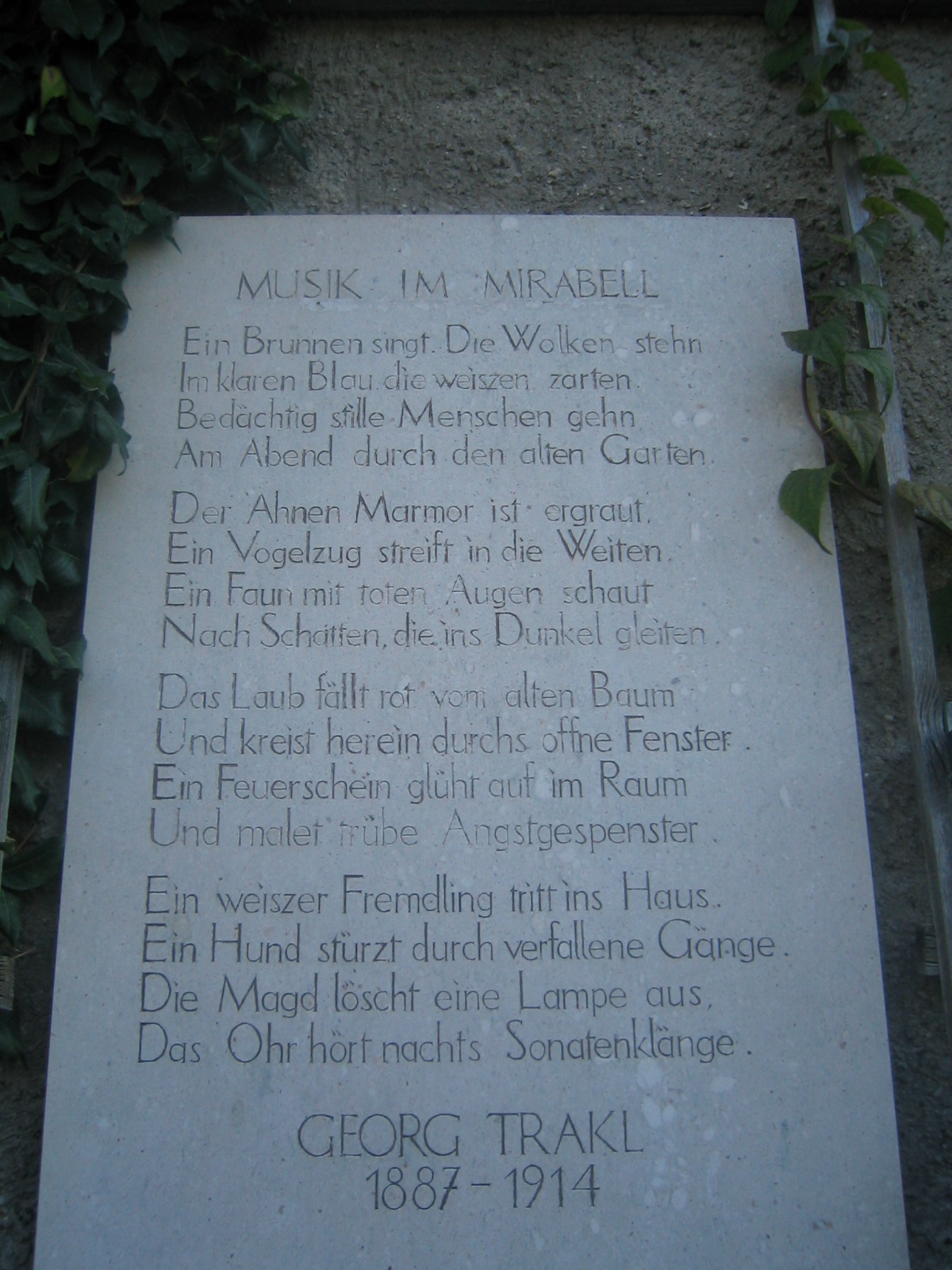
A poem by Trakl inscribed on a plaque in Mirabell Garden, Salzburg.

Georg Trakl (Austrian German: [ˈtraːkl̩]; 3 February 1887 – 3 November 1914) was an Austrian poet and the brother of the pianist Grete Trakl. He is considered one of the most important Austrian Expressionists. He is perhaps best known for his poem "Grodek", which he wrote shortly before he died of a cocaine overdose at the age of 27.

== Life and work ==
Trakl was born and lived the first 21 years of his life in Salzburg. His father, Tobias Trakl (11 June 1837, Ödenburg/Sopron – 1910), was a hardware dealer from Hungary. His mother, Maria Catharina Halik (17 May 1852, Wiener Neustadt – 1925), was a housewife of partly Czech descent who struggled with substance use disorder. She left her son's education to a French governess, who brought Trakl into contact with French language and literature at an early age. His sister Grete Trakl was a musical prodigy with whom he shared artistic endeavors. Poems allude to an incestuous relationship between the two.

From 1892 Trakl attended a Catholic elementary school, but he was released two afternoons a week for religious instruction from a Protestant pastor. He matriculated in 1897 at the Salzburg Staatsgymnasium, where he had problems in Latin, Greek, and mathematics, for which he had to repeat one year and then leave without Matura. At age 13, Trakl began to write poetry.

Carolyn Forché notes that "Given his dependence on opiates, his lack of financial independence, and his poetic vocation, he chose somewhat practically to become a dispensing chemist". From 1905, Trakl undertook a 3 year apprenticeship in a pharmacy; this facilitated access to drugs, such as morphine and cocaine. It was during this time that he experimented with playwriting, but his two short plays, All Souls' Day and Fata Morgana, were not successful. However, from May to December 1906, Trakl published four prose pieces in the feuilleton section of two Salzburg newspapers. All cover themes and settings found in his mature work. This is especially true of "Traumland" (Dreamland), in which a young man falls in love with a dying girl who is his cousin.

In 1908, Trakl moved to Vienna to study pharmacy, and became acquainted with some local artists who helped him publish some of his poems. Trakl's father died in 1910, soon before Trakl received his pharmacy certificate; thereafter, Trakl enlisted in the army for a year-long stint. His return to civilian life in Salzburg was unsuccessful and he re-enlisted, serving as a pharmacist at a hospital in Innsbruck. There he became acquainted with a group of avant-garde artists involved with the well-regarded literary journal Der Brenner, a journal that began the Kierkegaard revival in the German-speaking countries. Ludwig von Ficker, the editor of Der Brenner (and son of the historian Julius von Ficker), became his patron; he regularly printed Trakl's work and endeavored to find him a publisher to produce a collection of poems. The result of these efforts was Gedichte (Poems), published by Kurt Wolff in Leipzig during the summer of 1913. Ficker also brought Trakl to the attention of Ludwig Wittgenstein, who anonymously provided him with a sizable stipend so that he could concentrate on his writing. Johnston reports that Ficker selected Trakl to receive 20,000 crowns and that the "news of this windfall prompted the drug-ridden Trakl to vomit".

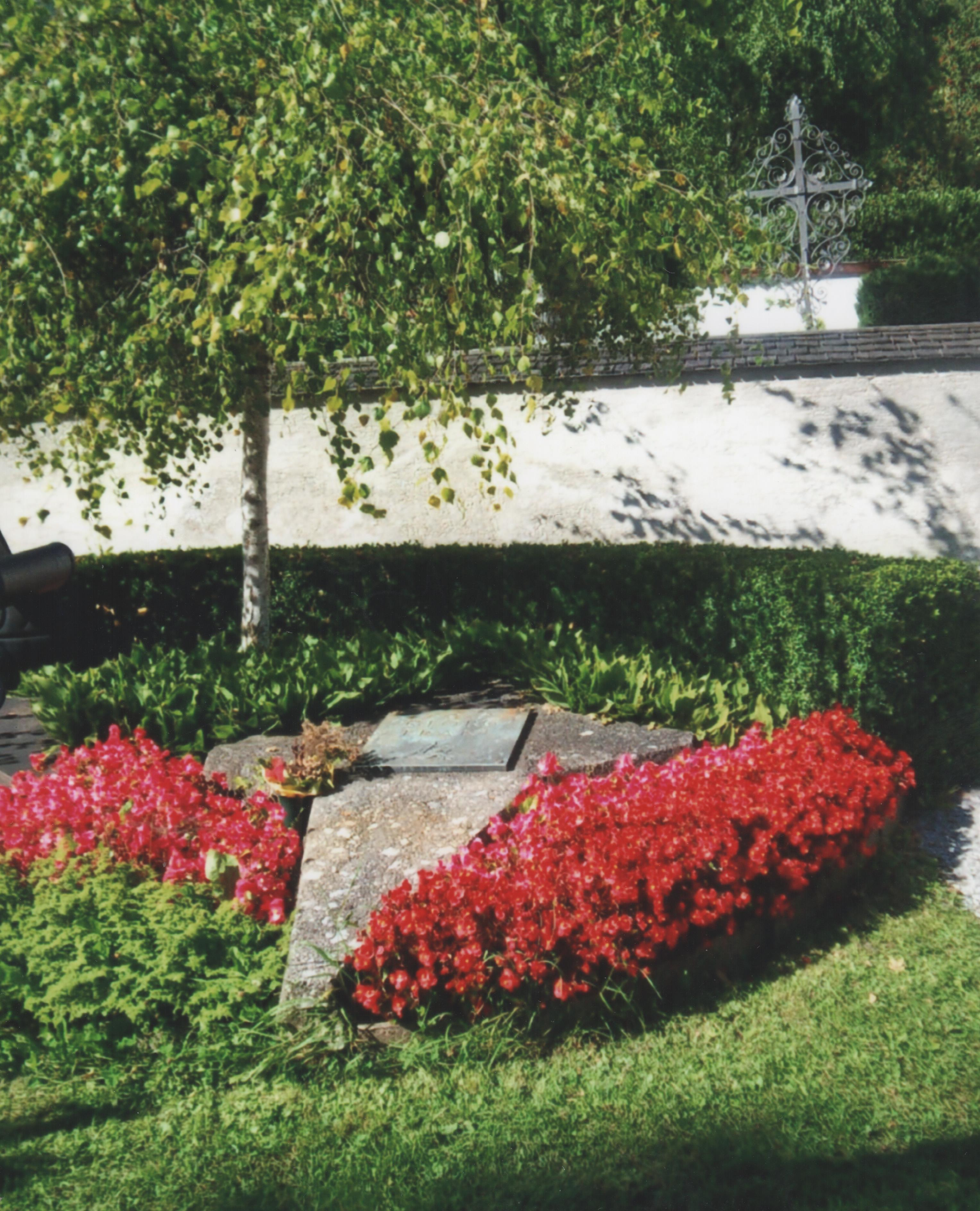
Grave of Georg Trakl

At the beginning of World War I, Trakl served in the Austro-Hungarian Army and was sent as a medical officer to attend soldiers on the Eastern Front. Trakl suffered frequent bouts of depression. On one such occasion during the Battle of Gródek (fought in autumn 1914 at Gródek, then in the Kingdom of Galicia and Lodomeria), Trakl had to steward the recovery of some ninety soldiers wounded in the fierce campaign against the Russians. He tried to shoot himself from the strain, but his comrades prevented him. Hospitalized at a military hospital in Kraków and observed closely, Trakl lapsed into worse depression and wrote to Ficker for advice. Ficker convinced him to communicate with Wittgenstein. Upon receiving Trakl's note, Wittgenstein travelled to the hospital, but found that Trakl had died of a cocaine overdose.

Trakl was buried at Kraków's Rakowicki Cemetery on 6 November 1914, but on 7 October 1925, as a result of the efforts by Ficker, his remains were transferred to the municipal cemetery of Innsbruck-Mühlau (where they now repose next to Ficker's).

== Themes and motifs ==
While Trakl's very earliest poems are more philosophical and do not deal as much with the real world, most of his poems are either set in the evening or have evening as a motif. Silence is also a frequent motif in Trakl's poetry, and his later poems often feature the silent dead, who are unable to express themselves.

== Bibliography ==
Selected titles

- Gedichte (Poems), 1913
- Sebastian im Traum (Sebastian in the Dream), 1915
- Der Herbst des Einsamen (The Autumn of The Lonely One), 1920
- Gesang des Abgeschiedenen (Song of the Departed), 1933

Literary works in English

- Decline: 12 Poems, trans. Michael Hamburger, Guido Morris / Latin Press, 1952
- Twenty Poems of George Trakl, trans. James Wright & Robert Bly, The Sixties Press, 1961
- Selected Poems, ed. Christopher Middleton, trans. Robert Grenier et al., Jonathan Cape, 1968
- Georg Trakl: Poems, trans. Lucia Getsi, Mundus Artium Press, 1973
- Georg Trakl: A Profile, ed. Frank Graziano, Logbridge-Rhodes, 1983
- Song of the West: Selected Poems, trans. Robert Firmage, North Point Press, 1988
- The Golden Goblet: Selected Poems of Georg Trakl, 1887–1914, trans. Jamshid Shirani & A. Maziar, Ibex Publishers, 1994
- Autumn Sonata: Selected Poems of Georg Trakl, trans. Daniel Simko, Asphodel Press, 1998
- Poems and Prose, Bilingual edition, trans. Alexander Stillmark, Libris, 2001
  - Re-edition: Poems and Prose. A Bilingual Edition, Northwestern University Press, 2005
- To the Silenced: Selected Poems, trans. Will Stone, Arc Publications, 2006
- In an Abandoned Room: Selected Poems by Georg Trakl, trans. Daniele Pantano, Erbacce Press, 2008
- The Last Gold of Expired Stars: Complete Poems 1908 - 1914, trans. Jim Doss & Werner Schmitt, Loch Raven Press, 2011
- Song of the Departed: Selected Poems of George Trakl, trans. Robert Firmage, Copper Canyon Press, 2012
- "Uncommon Poems and Versions by Georg Trakl", trans. James Reidel, Mudlark No. 53, 2014
- Poems, trans. James Reidel, Seagull Books, 2015
- Sebastian Dreaming, trans. James Reidel, Seagull Books, 2016
- A Skeleton Plays Violin, trans. James Reidel, Seagull Books, 2017
- Autumnal Elegies: Complete Poetry, trans. Michael Jarvie, 2019
- Surrender to Night: The Collected Poems of Georg Trakl, trans. Will Stone, Pushkin Collection 2019
- Collected Poems, trans. James Reidel, Seagull Books 2019
- Georg Trakl: The Damned, trans. Daniele Pantano, Broken Sleep Books 2023

Critical studies

- Erasmo Leiva-Merikakis, Blossoming Thorn: Georg Trakl's Poetry of Atonement, Bucknell University Press, 1987, ISBN 978-0838751022
- Richard Millington, Snow from Broken Eyes: Cocaine in the Lives and Works of Three Expressionist Poets, Peter Lang AG, 2012
- Richard Millington, The Gentle Apocalypse: Truth and Meaning in the Poetry of Georg Trakl, Camden House, 2020
- Hans Joachim Schliep, on the Table Bread and wine- poetry and Religion in the works of Georg Trakl, Lambert Academic Publishing (LAP), 2020, ISBN 978-6200537300

== Legacy ==
=== Poetry of Trakl in music ===
- Norwegian band Ulver uses a translated version of Trakl’s Helian on the song named Helian (Trakl) from the 2024 album Liminal Animals
- Experimental black metal artist Jute Gyte uses the entirety of Trakl’s “Helian” on the (2021) album with the same name
- The band Dead Eyed Sleeper uses Trakl's poem Menschheit as lyrics to the song of the same name, on the 2016 album Gomorrh.
- Paul Hindemith: Die Junge Magd - Sechs Gedichte von Georg Trakl für eine Altstimme mit Flöte, Klarinette und Streichquartett, opus 23 Nr.2
- 6 Lieder nach Gedichten von Georg Trakl, Op. 14 by Anton Webern.
- Peter Maxwell Davies: Revelation and Fall, Monodrama for soprano and instrumental ensemble, 1966.
- Wilhelm Killmayer set several of his poems in two song cycles, Trakl-Lieder in 1993 and Schweigen und Kindheit in 1996.
- Heinz Winbeck: Symphony No. 3 Grodek for alto, speaker, and orchestra (1988)
- Sebastian im Traum, 2004 orchestral composition by Hans Werner Henze based on Trakl's work.
- Russian composer David Tukhmanov wrote a triptych for mezzo-soprano and piano titled Dream of Sebastian, or Saint Night, which is based on the poems of Trakl. The first performance took place in 2007.
- Kristalliner Schrei, a 2014 setting of three poems from Gedichte for mezzo-soprano and string quartet, by Henry Breneman Stewart
- French composer Denise Roger (1924-2005) used Trakl’s texts in her songs “Rondel” and “Gesang einer gefangenen Amsel.”
- Trakl Gedichte by Philippe Manoury published by Éditions Durand
- Wild Winter: Lament V by Thea Musgrave

=== Poetry of Trakl in dance ===
- Silence Spoken: ...quiet answers to dark questions, an intersemiotic translation of five poems by Trakl into dance, choreographed by Angela Kaiser, 2015.

=== Portrayals in film ===
- Tabu – Es ist die Seele ein Fremdes auf Erden (2012)

== See also ==
- List of Austrian writers
