= Theosophy and visual arts =

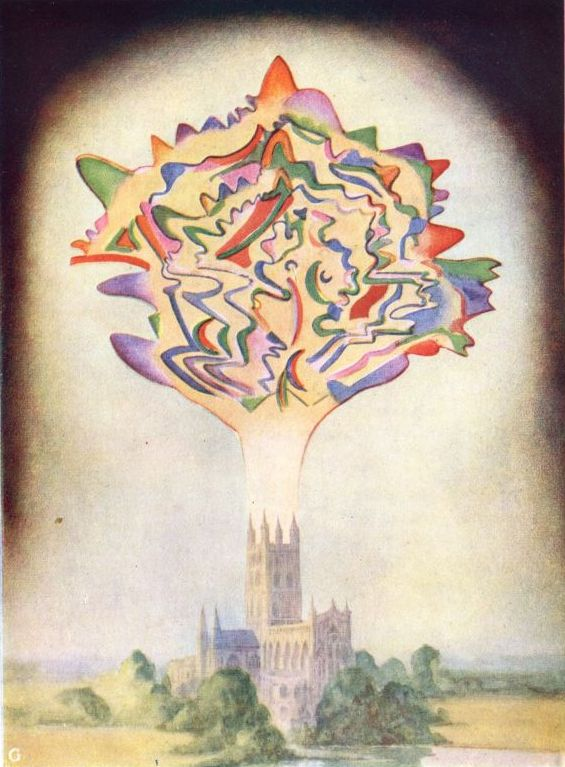
The Music of Gounod - a Thought Form, from the book Thought-Forms by Annie Besant and C.W. Leadbeater (Note: In fact, this picture became an emblem of study of the Theosophical influence on the modern arts: for example, see this page.)

Modern Theosophy has had considerable influence on the work of visual artists, particularly painters. Artists such as Wassily Kandinsky, Piet Mondrian, and Luigi Russolo chose Theosophy as the main ideological and philosophical basis of their work. (Note: In September 2013, an academic conference Enchanted Modernities: Theosophy and the Arts in the Modern World was held at the University of Amsterdam, at which about 50 reports were presented to an audience of 150 scholars. Most of these reports dealt with a question of Theosophy and the visual arts. In fine, as Wouter J. Hanegraaff noted, "contemporary art is a veritable fancy-fair of the esoteric and the occult.")

== Theosophical colour mysticism ==
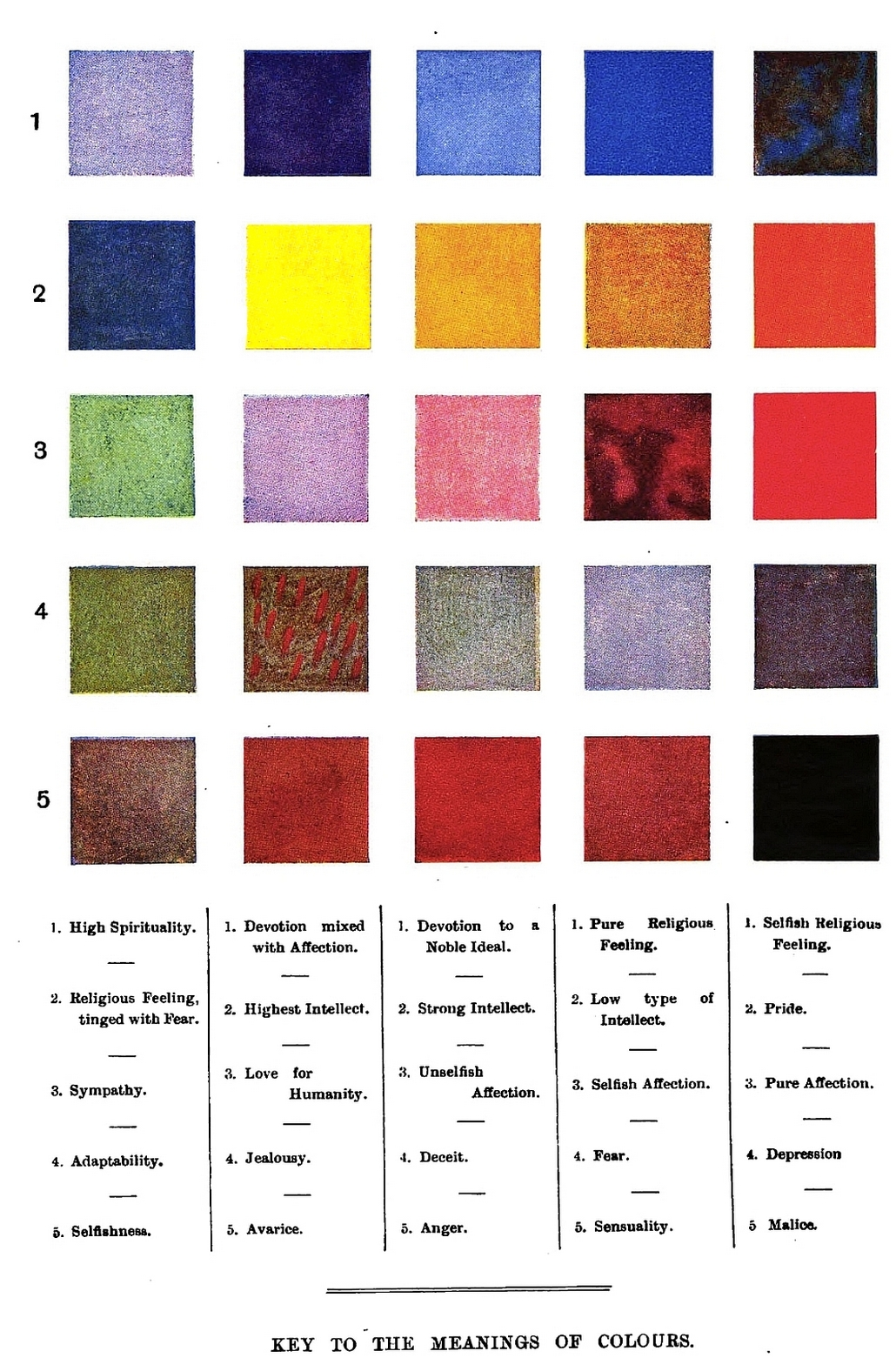
The Theosophical signification of colours.

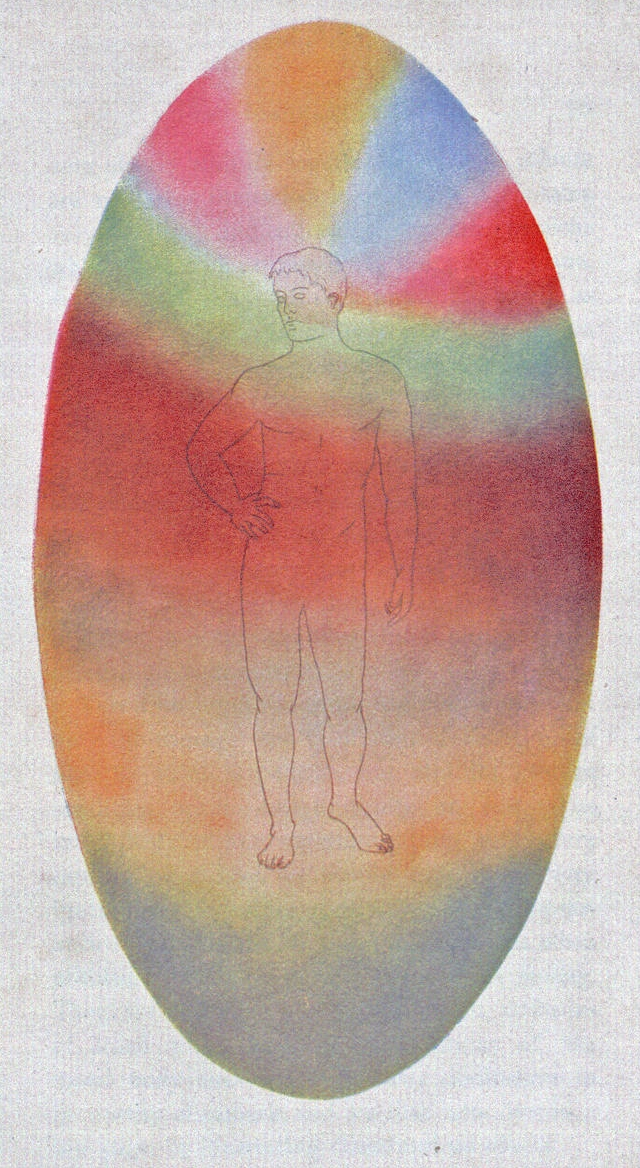
A painting representing the astral body of the average man, (Note: Robert Ellwood wrote that, according to Theosophy, "auras may be made up of a complex combination of etheric, astral, and mental matter." Olav Hammer wrote, "The aura is described as a colored sheath surrounding the physical body.") from C. W. Leadbeater's Man Visible and Invisible (1902)

The Theosophical teaching on the human aura was elaborated by Charles W. Leadbeater and Rudolf Steiner in early 1900s. (Note: Hammer wrote that "Leadbeater proposed a theory of the human aura" based on some Helena Blavatsky's ideas. According to Blavatsky, "Every person emits a magnetic exhalation or aura.") Both Leadbeater and Steiner stated that "clairvoyants" are gifted of seeing so-called "thought-forms" and "human auras." They have also written that the "impressions" received by such people from the "higher worlds" are similar with the "colour phenomena observed in the physical world." (Note: Steiner argued that "the wealth of colour in these higher worlds is immeasurably greater than in the physical world." He had also believed that artistic sensitivity is a prerequisite for the development of spiritual abilities, as it "pierces through the surface of things, and by so doing reaches their secrets.")

Nicholas Goodrick-Clarke pointed out that Annie Besant in collaboration with Leadbeater has also published an "influential book" titled Thought-Forms, a record of clairvoyant investigation. The frontispieces of both Thought-Forms and Man Visible and Invisible contain a table "The meanings of colours" of thought-forms and human aura associated with feelings and emotions, beginning with "High Spirituality" (light blue—in the upper left corner) and ending by "Malice" (black—in the lower right corner), 25 colors in all. (Note: Jay Johnston stated that Besant and Leadbeater "developed their proposition of the existence in subtle substance of pulsating forms, variably coloured that corresponded to the mental/emotional/spiritual experience of the individual.") According to Besant and Leadbeater, feelings and thoughts shape specific forms, for example, "lightning-like shapes" emerge in connection with "anger" and "malice," zig-zag lines show fear etc.

Thus, thanks to Besant, with Leadbeater and Steiner, the "Theosophical colour mysticism", as Sixten Ringbom has formulated, became a subject in which modern artists have been particularly interested. (Note: In Roger Lipsey's opinion, Theosophy was able to create "a visual language that entered into the mainstream twentieth-century art.") In addition, they were attracted by the Theosophical concept of a "universal harmony underlying the apparent chaos" of the physical world.

== Theosophists as artists ==
=== Blavatsky ===
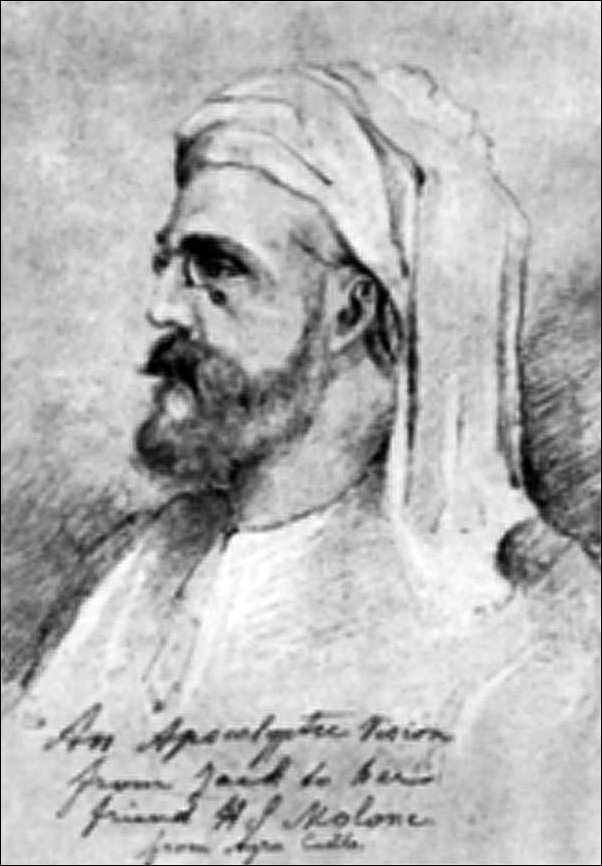
H. Olcott (1877) by H. Blavatsky.

Helena Blavatsky (1831–1891) had a developed gift for drawing, "but no pretensions as an artist." Massimo Introvigne wrote that "the first of a long list of Theosophical painters was none other than Madame Blavatsky herself." (Note: Some her pictures were performed with the automatic or trance drawing.) Paul Weinzweig spoke about her as "a completely cultured woman in the renaissance ideal." He noted that Blavatsky was a "scientist, poet, pianist, painter, philosopher, writer, educator."

=== Machell ===
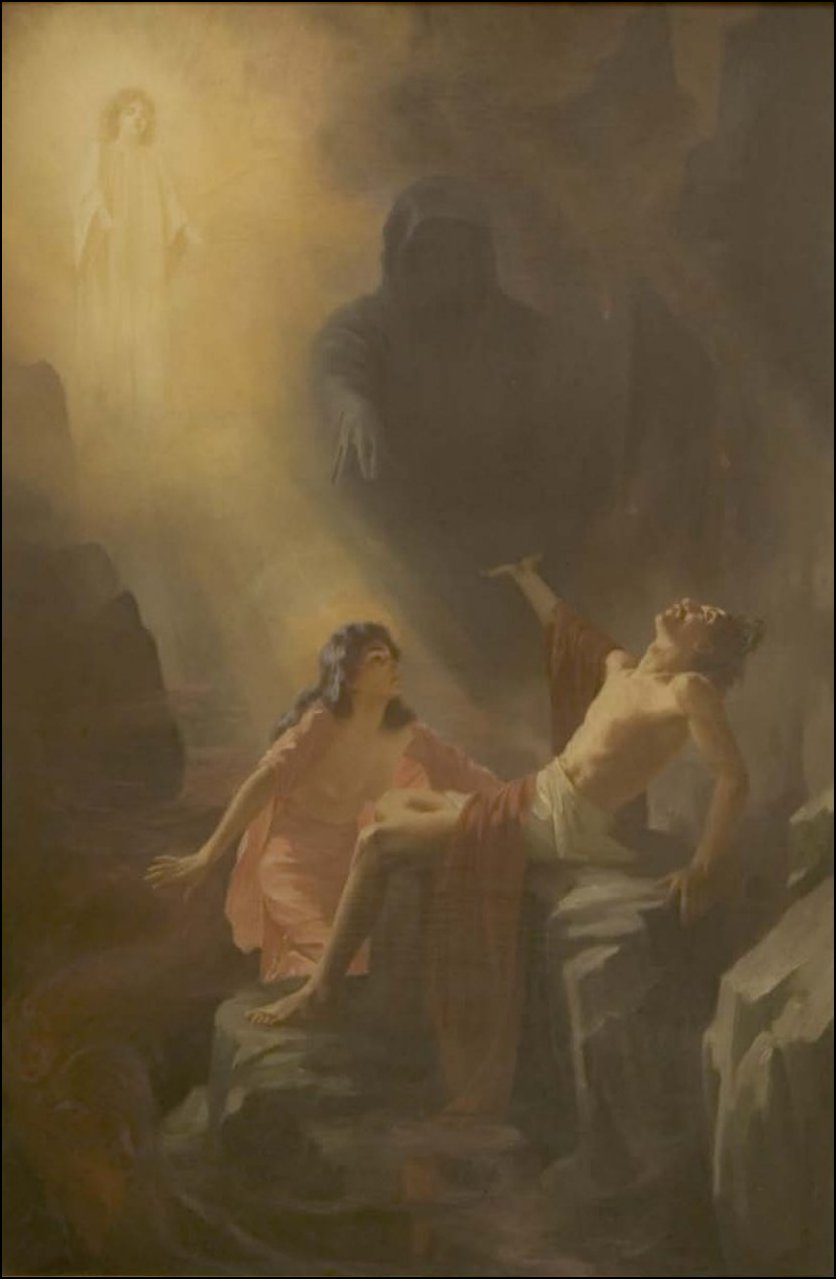
Dweller on the Threshold (1895).

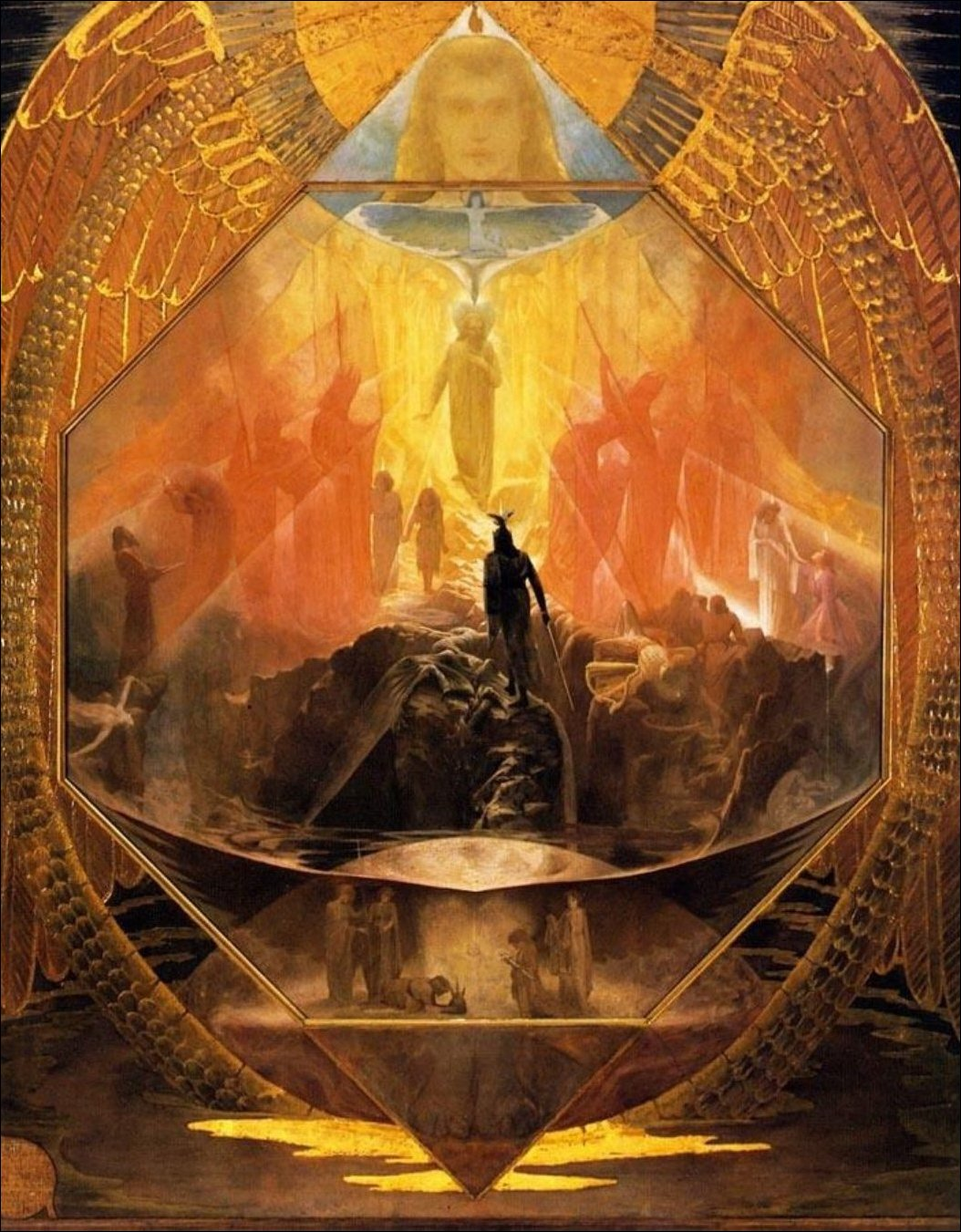
The Path (1895). (Note: This painting hangs in the administration building at the International Headquarters of the Theosophical Society Pasadena, California. It is in oil and gesso, measuring 6'2" × 7'5" [188 × 226 cm].)

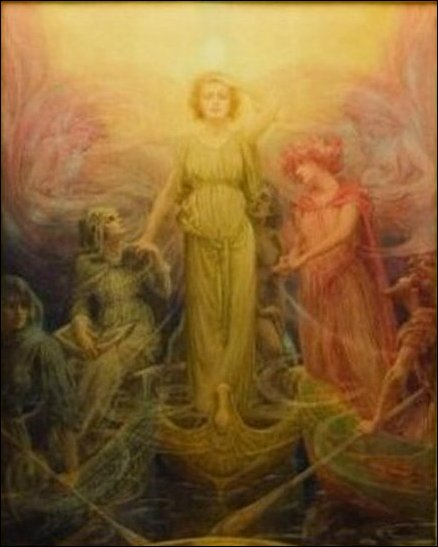
Vision of the New Day.

Reginald Willoughby Machell (1854–1927) was educated first at Uppingham School, then at Owen's College, having taken "many prizes in drawing and also in the classics." At last, he was sent to study in Paris at the Académie Julian. In 1880, he returned to London and worked as a portrait painter. In 1893, he was elected a member of the Royal Society of British Artists. He created also illustrations to the books An Idol's Passion (1895) and The Chant of a Lonely Soul (1897) by an American novelist Irene Osgood.

In 1887, Machell was introduced to Blavatsky herself by a friend of one of his aunts. In 1888, he joined the Theosophical Society. His paintings began to obtain a mystical and symbolist character. It may be related with such his works as Dweller on the Threshold, The Birth of the Planet, and Lead Kindly Light. Machell's Theosophical art had its "triumph" in The Path (1895). He described this painting as follows:

THE PATH is the way by which the human soul must pass it its evolution to full spiritual self-consciousness. The supreme condition is suggested in this work by the great figure whose head in the upper triangle is lost in the glory of the Sun above, and whose feet are in the lower triangle in the waters of Space, symbolizing Spirit and Matter. His wings fill the middle region representing the motion or pulsation of cosmic life, while within the octagon are displayed the various planes of consciousness, through which humanity must rise to attain a perfect Manhood. At the top is a winged Isis, the Mother or Oversoul whose wings veil the face of the Supreme from those below. There is a circle dimly seen of celestial figures who hail with joy the triumph of a new initiate, one who has reached to the heart of the Supreme. From that point he looks back with compassion upon all who still are wandering below and turns to go down again to their help as a Saviour of Men. Below him is the red ring of the guardians who strike down those who have not the "password," symbolized by the white flame floating over the head of the purified aspirant. Two children, representing purity, pass up unchallenged. In the centre of the picture is a warrior who has slain the dragon of illusion, the dragon of the lower self, and is now prepared to cross the gulf by using the body of the dragon as his bridge (for we rise on steps made of conquered weaknesses, the slain dragon of the lower nature).

His painting Vision of the New Day continues a theme of The Path. The New Day is a symbol of enlightenment, which the human soul can achieve, avoiding the temptations of materialism.

In 1900, Machell moved to the United States and joined the Theosophical community at Point Loma established by Katherine Tingley.

=== Schmiechen ===
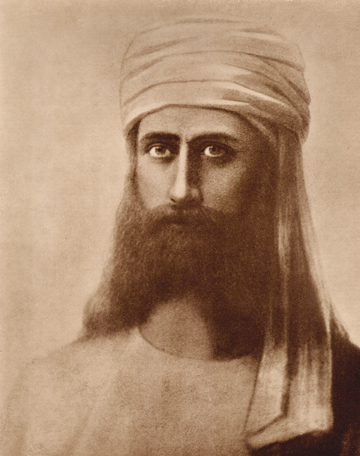
Morya (1884).

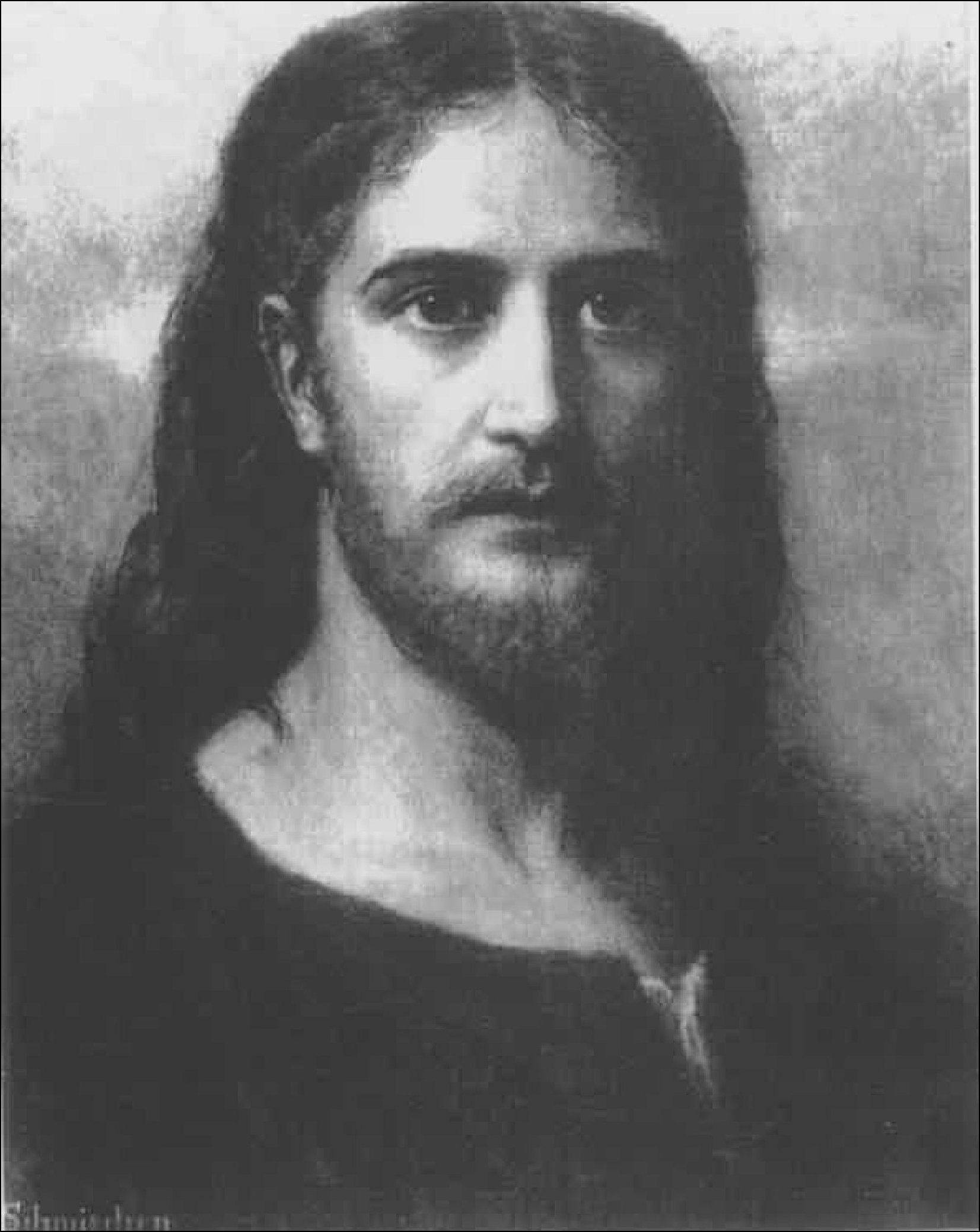
Jesus (1910).

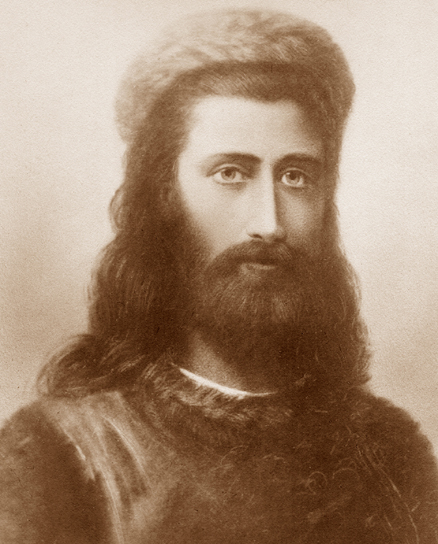
Koot Hoomi (1884).

Hermann Schmiechen (1855–1923) joined the Theosophical Society in London on 20 June 1884. And, fulfilling the request of Blavatsky, he began to paint portraits of the Theosophical Masters. The portrait of the Master Koot Hoomi she assessed as "excellent" and immediately asked Schmiechen to begin working on a portrait of the Master Morya. It took him about three weeks, to complete these paintings. Some authors believe that Schmichen's work was a kind of "psychic experiment", and images of the Masters were transmitted to him telepathically. In Introvigne's opinion, the most significant portraits of the mahatmas "in Theosophical history" were painted by Schmiechen.

Brendan French made examination these portraits and, according to his conclusions, he stated that Schmiechen

appears to have been significantly influenced by the Venetian cinquecento, in particular by the deceptive tranquillity of Titian's portraiture; equally, he seems to be enamoured of Rembrandt's psychologically-pregnant portraits... That the Masters' portraits should resonate with Christological overtones is hardly surprising. Schmiechen, like most Western artists concerned to invest their images with qualities of transcendence, turned for inspiration to the foundational iconographical type of divine-human hypostasis, the Biblical Christ. The iconic potentialities of a Christ portrait were imported by Schmiechen into his own depiction of semi-divinised men, the Masters. Indeed, he employed several standard devices: an undifferentiated background; over-large, staring eyes; a frontal composition designed to focus attention directly upon the subject's confronting gaze; a sense of sagacity heightened by indications of the sitter's self-possession; no distracting detail in vestment or jewellery; and a framing of the features by long hair and a beard.

=== af Klint ===
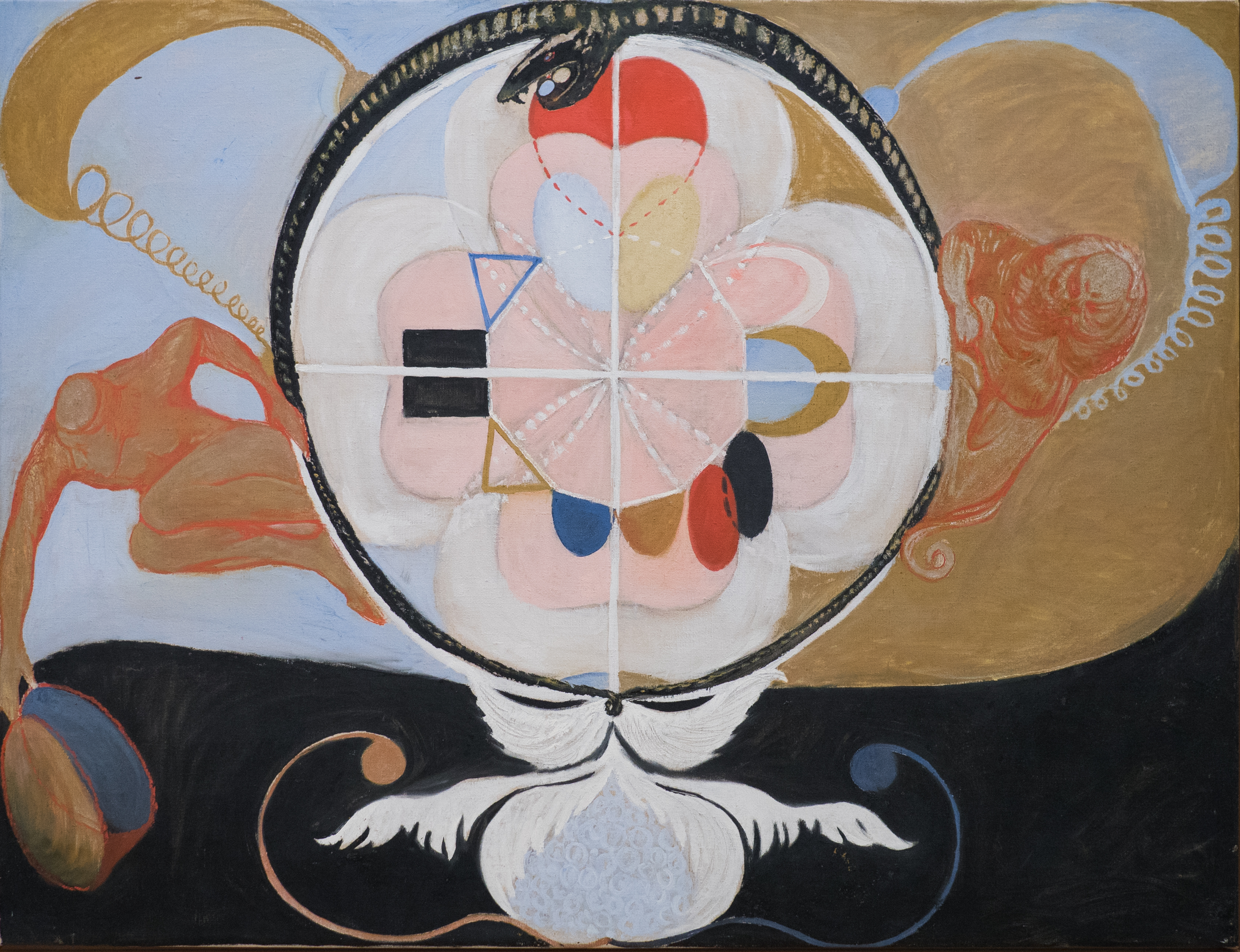
Evolution No. 13 (1908).

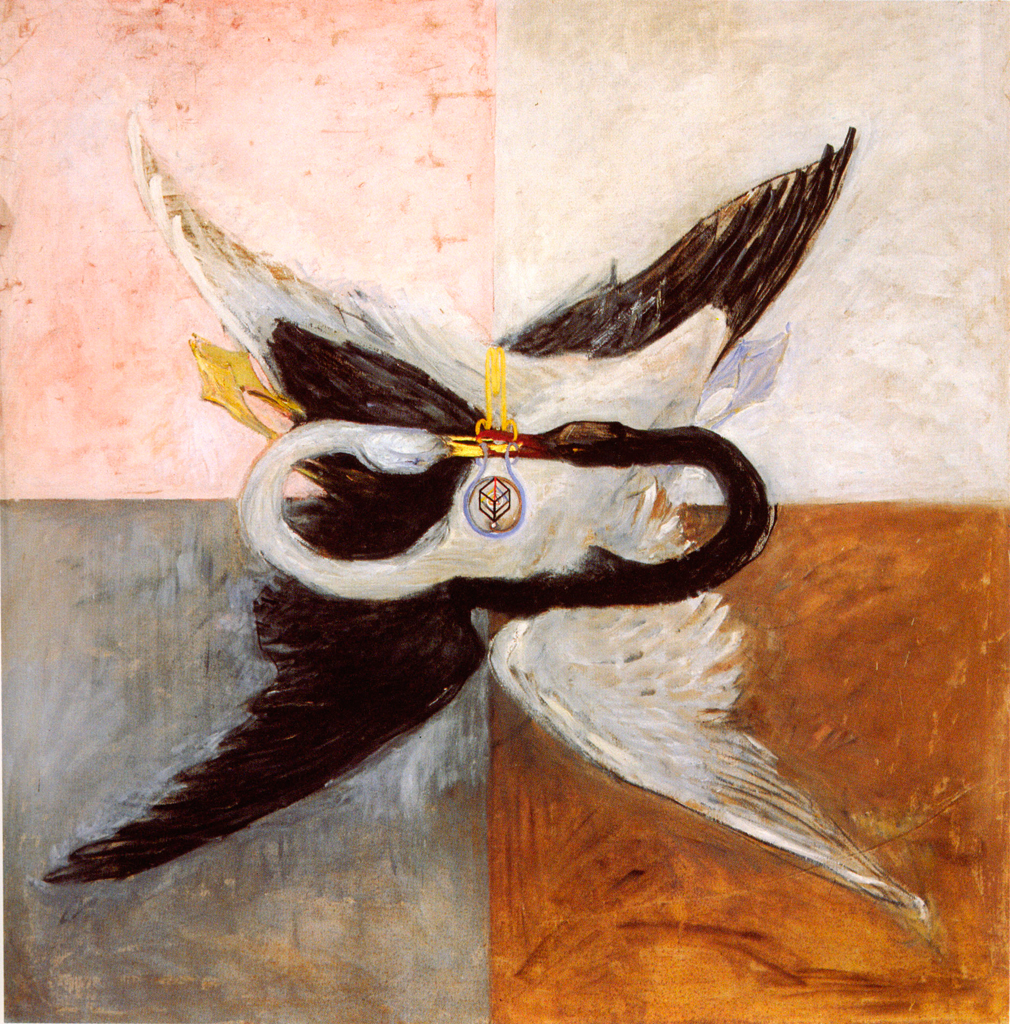
Svanen (1914).

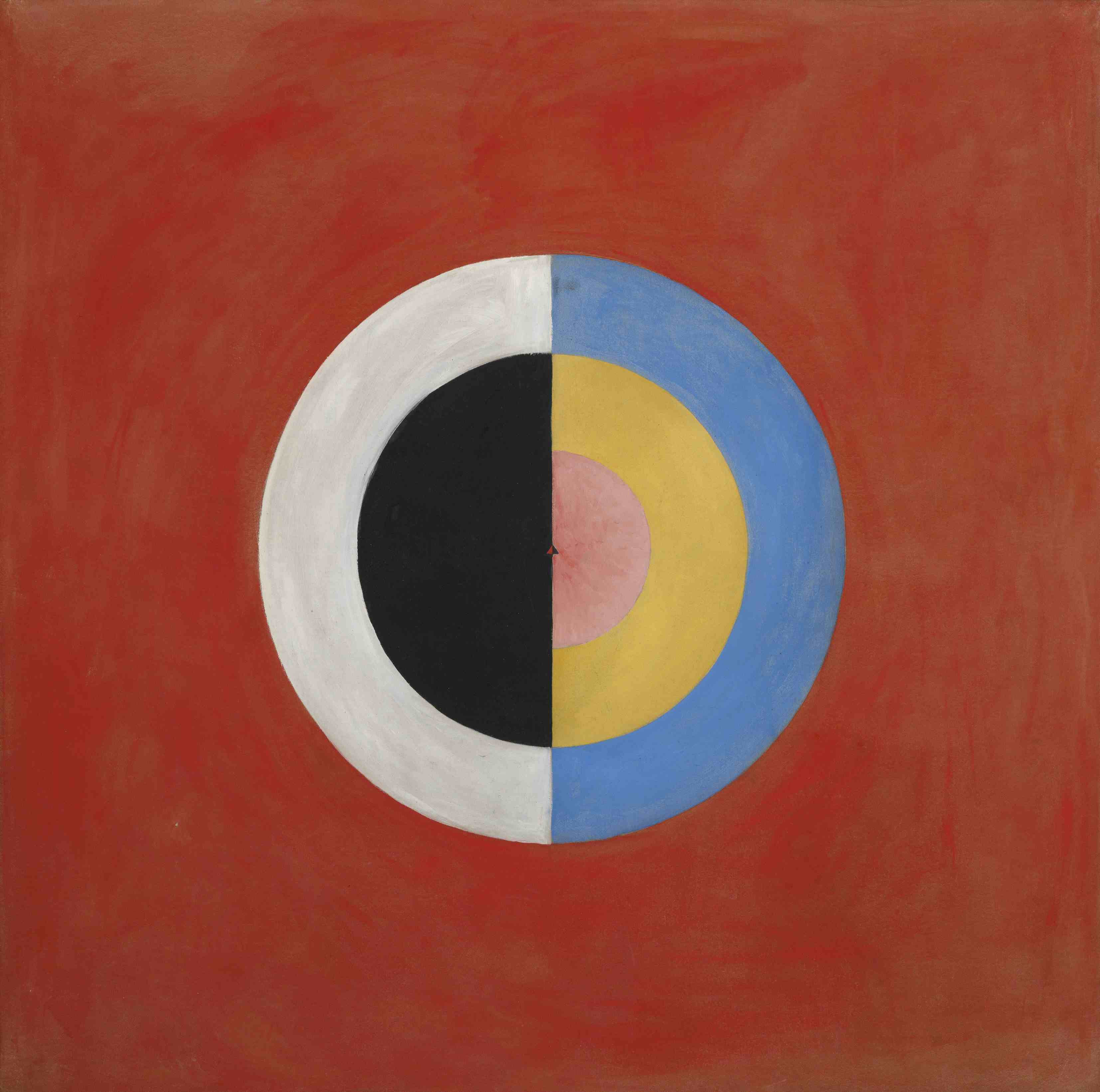
Svanen No. 17 (1915).

Hilma af Klint (1862–1944) "experimented with automatic drawing in a Spiritualist setting." (Note: She studied Spiritualism and became herself a medium. In 1896, she formed the group The Five (Swedish: De Fem), which "produced automatic paintings.") She joined the Theosophical Society Adyar on May 23, 1904. In 1920, af Klint became a member of the Anthroposophical Society and began "spending long periods in Dornach." The Theosophical and Anthroposophical ideas were a source of the inspiration for many of her paintings. She painted "several series of impressive paintings exploring spiritual or sacred concepts". Her unique style united, in Tessel Bauduin's opinion, "geometric and biomorphic form with a free line". (Note: She has been also discerned as an "abstract pioneer predating Kandinsky.") Af Klint considered abstract art to be the "spiritual precursor of a utopian social harmony, a world of tomorrow." According to Introvigne, only recently, after several exhibitions in different countries, she was recognized as an important European abstract artist.

=== Fuller ===
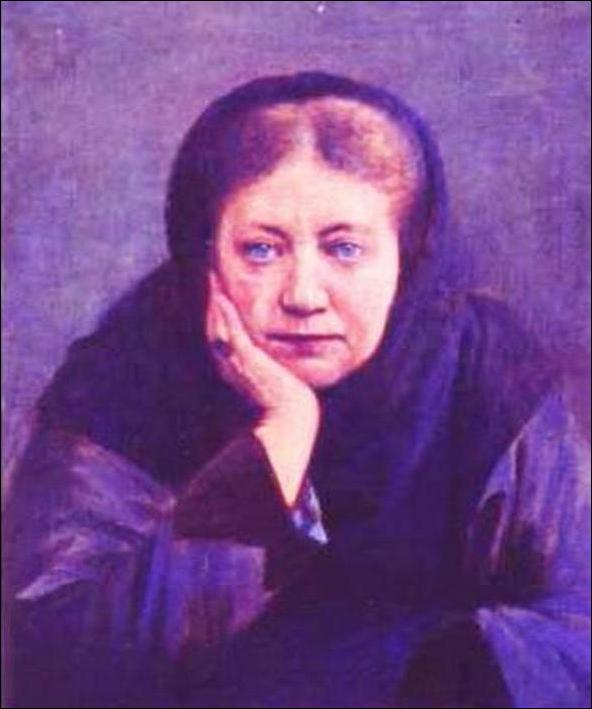
Mme Blavatsky (1908).

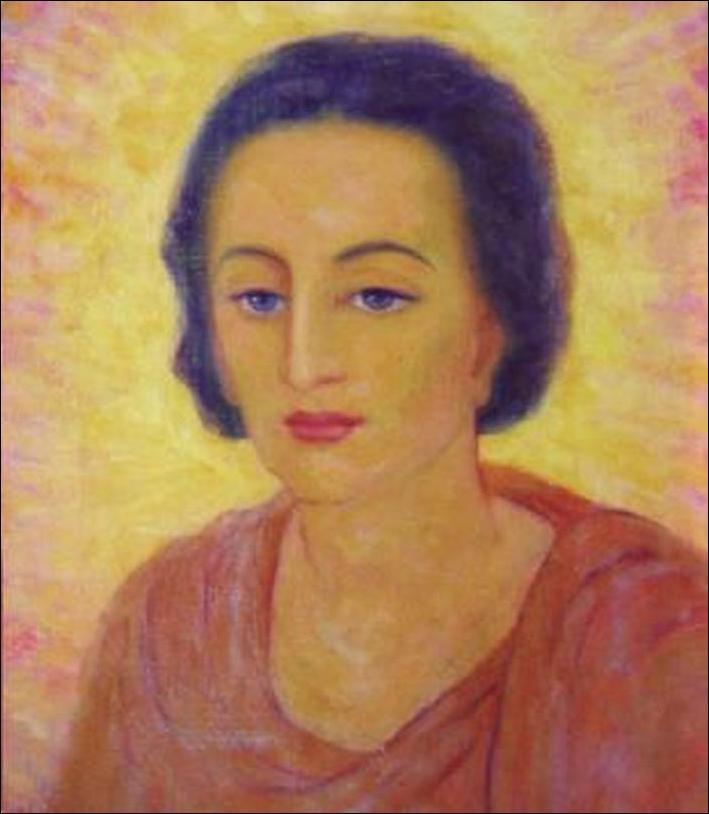
Lord Buddha (1910).

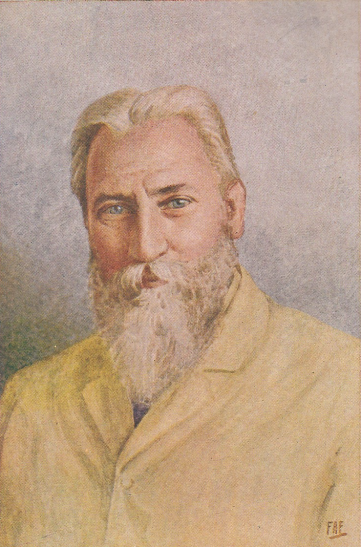
C. W. Leadbeater (1911).

Florence Fuller (1867–1946) joined the Theosophical Society in 1905. In the same year, she created A Golden Hour "widely regarded as a national Australian masterpiece." From 1908 to 1911 in Adyar, she painted portraits of the leaders of the Theosophical Society and the Theosophical Masters. (Note: Jenny McFarlane praised the portrait of C. W. Leadbeater created by Fuller in 1911.)

In Adyar, Fuller created an "unknown number" of portraits of the mahatmas, including the Lord Buddha. Of these, only a portrait of the Master Buddha has been published. In Brendan French's opinion, this portrait illustrates reducing "sex characteristics, and thus appear androgynous." He argued this is "founded in Renaissance angelology." According to McFarlane, Fuller chose the colors for this painting in full accordance with the Theosophical canon expounded in Thought-Forms by Besant and Leadbeater.

=== Mondrian ===
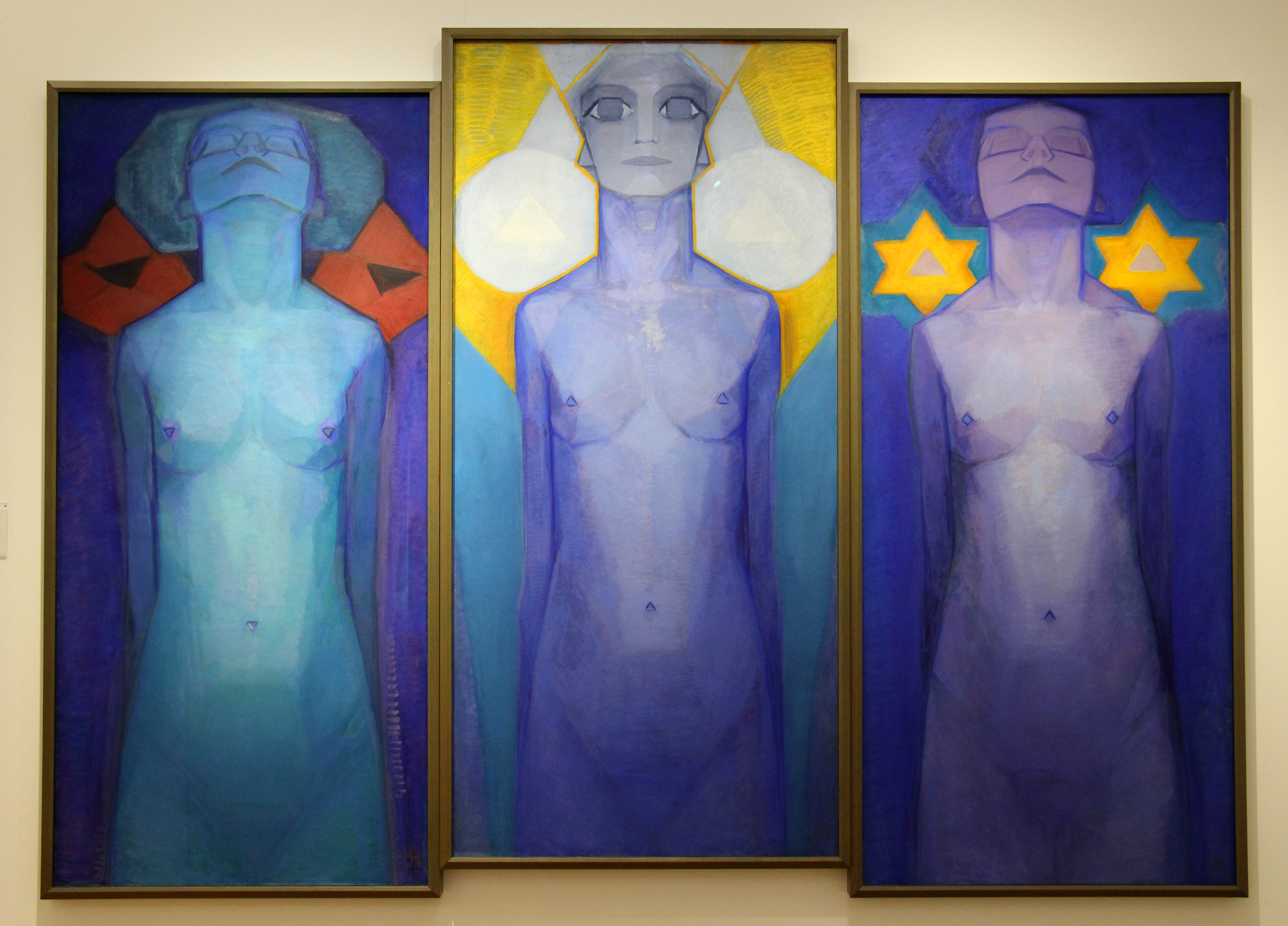
Evolution (1911). (Note: Oil on canvas, triptych. Centre panel, 183 × 87.5 cm, side panels 178 × 85 cm. Gemeentemuseum Den Haag.)

In the early 1900s, Piet Mondrian (1872–1944) had read the Theosophical literature with great interest, including The Great Initiates by Édouard Schuré. He joined the Dutch Section of the TS in 1909. As Carel Blotkamp stated, "It is abundantly clear that Theosophy was of crucial importance to Mondrian." (Note: His phrase, "I got everything from The Secret Doctrine," is widely cited.)

Michel Seuphor wrote that Mondrian's religion "went from Calvinism to Theosophy and from Theosophy to Neoplasticism," that had included Theosophy and became his main world-view. Mondrian believed that his neoplastic concept should in the "most objective and rational way possible transmit" the Theosophical idea of the Absolute. In his opinion, the neoplastic art will in future replace religion. And artist's role – "as priest of this religious art – will consist in helping the common man reach the desired after inner balance." (Note: Bauduin wrote that Mondrian "was most concerned with cosmic harmony, which was to be expressed in a correct balance between general and abstract elements representative of absolute truth and absolute beauty.")

Mondrian chose for his "monumental triptych" Evolution, a theme which is one of the main doctrines in the Theosophical teaching. (Note: The "Evolution" contain the Theosophical elements in full.) According to Robert Welsh, the blue and yellow colors used in the work can be explained as astral "shells or radiations" of the figures. Can be thought that these personages take part in the Theosophical initiation. However, one should examine them as the same person "viewed in three complementary aspects." If go in the order "left, right, and center," we have a standard mystical advancement "from matter through soul to spirit." In Isis Unveiled, Blavatsky wrote:

Three spirits live and actuate man, teaches Paracelsus; three worlds pour their beams upon him; but all three only as the image and echo of one and the same all-constructing and uniting principle of production. The first is the spirit of the elements (terrestrial body and vital force in its brute condition); the second, the spirit of the stars (sidereal or astral body—the soul); the third is the Divine spirit (Augoeidés).

=== Roerich ===
Nicholas Roerich (1874–1947) and his wife Helena created Agni Yoga, a "Theosophically inspired form of esotericism." This "neo-Theosophical" doctrine was first explained in 1929. (Note: The Roerichs joined the Russian Section of the TS (perhaps unofficially) before the First World War.) Introvigne designated the Roerichs' doctrine as a "Theosophical schism." (Note: Anita Stasulane wrote that the "Roerichs' relation with the Russian Section of the TS was seriously affected by the issue of the right to translate Blavatsky's works.") According to Joscelyn Godwin, Roerich was "probably the most thoroughly Theosophical of 20th-century painters, although opinions of his merit vary."

== Artists and Theosophy ==
=== Kandinsky ===
External image
- Works by Wassily Kandinsky
- A Woman in Moscow (1912). (Note: According to John E. Bowlt and Gary Lachman, in this painting the influence of Thought-Forms is quite visible.)

Even before 1910, (Note: In 1910, Kandinsky painted his first abstract work.) Wassily Kandinsky (1866–1944) studied the Theosophical books of Blavatsky, Besant and Leadbeater, Steiner, and Schuré. (Note: Ringbom noted that Kandinsky's interest in Theosophy and esotericism was not "some kind of personal hobby, a strictly private amusement which played a negligible role in the formation of his artistic outlook.") In 1912, he wrote in his main theoretical work Über das Geistige in der Kunst on the importance of Theosophy "for his art". (Note: Moshe Barasch pointed out that Theosophy "was of direct concern to Kandinsky." It became a "significant factor" in his "intellectual world.") According to Boris Falikov, Theosophy helped Kandinsky conceptually to comprehend creative and spiritual experiences, which, as he understood, "more and more merged into a single whole." The works by Blavatsky, Steiner, and their like-minded people helped him not only to conceptualize his experience, but also to formulate his own mission, which combined the artistic and religious dimension. He comprehended that he was an active participant in the turn to the spiritual world about which "Theosophy prophesied."

In his treatise, Kandinsky stated that Blavatsky began "one of the greatest spiritual movements which unites a great number of people and which also has established a material form of this spiritual phenomenon in the Theosophical Society." He presented a long quotation from Blavatsky's book The Key to Theosophy:

A new herald of truth will find the minds of men prepared for his message... A new manner of expression is created in which to clothe the new truths, an organization which will await his arrival, and will then proceed to remove the merely material obstacles and difficulties from his path.

According to Ringbom, in the "General Part" of his treatise, Kandinsky has actually repeated Schuré's introduction into the Theosophical doctrine. This fact is confirmed his "polemic against materialism, positivism and scepticism, the references to spiritism and psychical research as proofs of the approaching spiritual synthesis of science, religion and art." Rose-Carol Washton Long wrote that Theosophy convinced Kandinsky that "hidden imagery could be a powerful method" of conveying the spiritual ideas. In his lexicon, Leadbeater's concept of vibration was fixed for life. He used it in his "most famous image" of creativity:

Colour is a means of exercising direct influence upon the soul. Colour is the keyboard. The eye is the hammer, while the soul is a piano of many strings. The artist is the hand through which the medium of the corresponding keys causes the human soul to vibrate. It is, thus, evident that colour harmony can rest only on the principle of the corresponding touch to the human soul. (Note: In Bowlt's opinion, the Theosophical colour symbolism was the bait that attracted Kandinsky to the "world of Theosophy.")

=== Lechter ===
External images
- Works by Melchior Lechter
- Panis Angelorum (1906). (Note: According to Jan Stottmeister, this painting joins an "apparently Catholic subject, the Holy Communion," with the Theosophical teaching on aura.)
- Sacred Tower (1917).
- Shambhala (1925).

Melchior Lechter (1865–1937) studied painting at the Hochschule der Künste, Berlin. In 1896 at Berlin, he had his first exhibition. He was also a publisher, founder the Unicorn Press (German: Einhorn Presse), and "had an interest in Theosophy." In his paintings and writings, Lechter integrated "ideas of both the medieval German and the ancient Indian mystics."

Lechter had "his own ideas" about the nature of colour. For example, he believed that Rembrandt in his picture Joseph and Potiphar's Wife (Rembrandt) had expressed the "smouldering lewdness of the woman through the yellowish brown mud-colour of her cloak which, moreover, looked as if it were moist." He also argued that expressive quality of the colours by which a "painter could symbolize the character of his subject" was the artistic reproduction of a natural phenomenon, because, in his opinion, "from everyone a special variegated aura emanates which, however, could only be seen by people who were endowed with a special faculty." Jan Stottmeister called Lechter's worldview the "Theosophical Catholicism", since he explained the esoteric significance of "his exoteric Catholicism" with quotations from The Secret Doctrine by Blavatsky and Thought-Forms by Besant and Leadbeater.

=== Kupka ===
External images
- Works by František Kupka
- The Dream (1909). (Note: Oil on cardboard, 30.5 × 31.5 cm. Museum Bochum, Germany.)
- Woman Picking Flowers (1909). (Note: Pastel on paper, 45 × 47 cm. Centre Pompidou, Musée National d'Art Moderne, Paris.)
- Localization of Graphic Motifs II (1913).

František Kupka (1871–1957) had been a "practicing spiritist medium" in Prague and Vienna before his moving to Paris in 1896. Like Kandinsky, he "found inspiration in Theosophy and the occult, and promoted a subjective-intuitive approach to art." Among the Theosophical sources, Besant and Leadbeater's book Thought-Forms had great influence for him. He was interested in the Theosophical theory of colour as well as a scientific one. Like Mondrian, Kupka accepted an idea of the fourth dimension "as a supplement" to his Theosophical faith. (Note: Leadbeater used a term the fourth dimension, talking in his books about "astral vision." According to Bauduin, the "fourth dimension" and the Theosophical "astral plane" are equivalent concepts.)

In Chelsea Jones' opinion, Kupka's painting The Dream (1909) confirms his "interest in Buddhism, Theosophy, and science and represents his belief in the immaterial." She wrote that this work also demonstrates the "Theosophical notion" on astral vision:

In The Dream, Kupka presented a vision of invisible reality. Here the imaginary floating forms dominate the scene; they dwarf the forms of visible reality, as represented by the fleshy forms lying in sleep. Through the variation in scale between the dream figures and their earthly forms, Kupka clearly made the painting about an experience of invisible reality with the immaterial dominating the material. (Note: On the lower left corner of the painting, Kupka wrote: "My dear Ninie, Here I sketch the dream that I had of the two of us—Yours, Franc." (French: Ma Chère Ninie, Voici ébauche le reve que J'ai eu-nous deux—Ton Franc.))

=== Beckmann ===
External images
- Works by Max Beckmann
- Die Geburt (1937).
- Der Tod (1938).
- Sketch for Frühe Menschen (No. 5).
- Sketch for Frühe Menschen (No. 8).
- Sketch for Frühe Menschen (No. 9).
- Sketch for Frühe Menschen (No. 11).

Max Beckmann (1884–1950) was, like both Mondrian and Kandinsky, interested in the "Theosophical theory" of Blavatsky and also began to study the Vedas and Indian philosophy. (Note: He has read all volumes of the German translations of The Secret Doctrine (German: Geheimlehre) and Isis Unveiled (German: Entschleierte Isis).)

In Vladimir Ivanov's opinion, Beckmann's painting the Death (German: Der Tod) requires the Theosophical commentary, without which the meaning of the composition is impossible to understand. Obviously, depicting death, Beckman "relied" on the knowledge he had learned from reading the Theosophical literature. The composition includes the moment of development in time, passing into the timeless (astral) dimension: various stages of post-mortem states are shown. Ivanov stated that the painter introduced the post-mortem experiences of a person burdened with vices. The upper part of the painting is compositionally dominant over the lower one in its meaning and value. Another peculiarity is that the picture represents different time phases and existential states. In the middle is a strange image of the creature with an extinguished candle. Six trotters peek out from under the robe, that immediately makes it clear about the astral nature of this character. The transition from the earthly to the supersensible is traced. Further action takes place in the upper part of the composition, which needs a "hermetic" interpretation.

Theosophy represents death as "a long process consisting of various changing phases." The first phase is connected with the experience of kâmaloka. Besant explained it as follows: "Kâmaloka, literally the place or habitat of desire, is... a part of the astral plane, not divided from it as a distinct locality, but separated off by the conditions of consciousness of the entities belonging to it." Beckman wanted to show that the selection and objectification of ended life memories occurs in kâmaloka. According to Ivanov, the monsters at the top of the composition are "nothing more than the objectification of the mental states of the deceased woman." Besant wrote that the first experience after death will be the seeing of the "panorama" of the past life, which at the "death hour" unfolds before every dead in all the experienced details. She stated that "he sees his ambitions with their success or frustration... the predominant tendency of the whole comes clearly out, the ruling thought of the life asserts itself, and stamps itself deeply into the soul, marking the region in which the chief part of his post-mortem existence will be spent." The double structure of the composition Death should be also explained from the Theosophical point of view, because the viewing life after death is done in reverse order: from end to beginning. Ivanov referred on Steiner who has written: "During the time of purification man, as it were, lives his life in reverse order... He begins with the events that immediately preceded death and experiences everything in reverse order back to childhood." Other facts, events, and beings in the astral world are also accepted in reverse order. Leadbeater said that the clairvoyant will find it difficult to be aware of what he sees, and even more difficult of that—to put into words everything he observed. A vivid example of the misconceptions that an observer may undergo is the reverse placement of numbers reflected in the "astral light". For example, 931 instead of 139, and so on. Therefore, the characters depicted upside down in the upper part of the composition testify to the painter knowledge of the laws of the astral plane.

Beckmann was uncommonly "impressed" by The Secret Doctrine which he ended to read in 1934. Then he made several different sketches "on the theme" of its second volume Anthropogenesis. The album with these sketches is in the National Gallery (Washington, D.C.). Along with sketches in the album there are excerpts from this book by Blavatsky. A series of sketches is devoted to the development of motives, which then found their finished expression in the work Early Men (German: Frühe Menschen). (Note: See Frühe Menschen (1947) by Max Beckmann on this page.)

=== Russolo ===
External images
- Works by Luigi Russolo
- Maschere (1908).
- Linee-forza della folgore (1912).

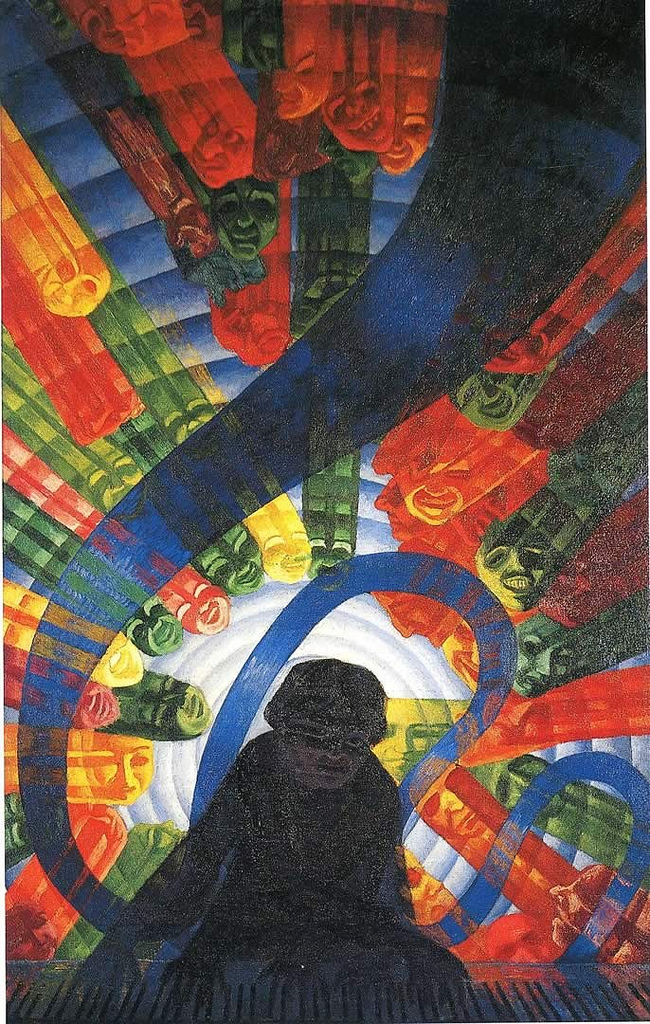
La musica (1912). (Note: Oil on canvas, 220 × 140 cm. Estorick Collection of Modern Italian Art, London.)

Luigi Russolo (1885–1947) had interest in occultism and Theosophy. In Luciano Chessa's opinion, Theosophy is the "key" that makes it possible to "identify, decode, and contextualize" Russolo's interest in the occult, which is present in his compositions: from his "printmaking and paintings" to his theoretical works on music.

In creativity of Russolo, the Theosophical ideas had been first used in his etching and aquatint Masks (Italian: Maschere, 1908). His reading the Theosophical books by Besant and Leadbeater on sound-forms "probably influenced one of his most icastic" paintings, Force Lines of Lightning (Italian: Linee-forza della folgore, 1912). The triangular picture of the shock wave in this painting is "extraordinarily close" to the depiction of the sound-forms of a thunderstorm, which described in Leadbeater's The Hidden Side of Things: "The majestic roll of a thunderstorm creates usually a vast flowing band of colour, while the deafening crash often calls into temporary existence an arrangement of irregular radiations... or sometimes a huge irregular sphere with spikes projecting from it in all directions."

Chessa wrote that Russolo's painting La musica represents, according to Leadbeater, "the hidden side of the performance of a piece of music." The painting demonstrates a pianist playing in a "state of rapturous enthusiasm." The lines of his face can hardly be distinguished. His hands are "represented in a mad, virtuosic dash along an infinite keyboard." (Note: According to Marianne Martin, the many-armed pianist in La musica symbolizes Śiva Nataraja, the "creator and lord of the cosmic dance in the Hindu pantheon," and it proves Russolo's interest in Eastern philosophies, which "were a main source" of Theosophy.) This work, like Maschere, shows a series of flying masks with various expressions that can readily be interpreted as a "visualization or materialization of the different states of mind" of a pianist-medium, which performed by spirits he himself has summoned. The authors of Thought-Forms explained that the spirits that "reside in the astral plane have the energy to change the course of thought-forms that already exist, and to make them move." In Chessa's opinion, this painting is "structured according to criteria presented in Thought-Forms, in particular the section of the book that describes the forms produced by music." (Note: Introvigne confirmed that Thought-Forms influenced Russolo, and noted, as example, his work La musica.)

=== Ginna ===
Arnaldo Ginna (born Arnaldo Ginanni Corradini; 1890–1982), like Kandinsky, had theoretical works on the arts (for example, Arte dell'avvenire [Art of the Future], 1910 and Pittura dell'avvenire [Painting of the Future], 1915). Germano Celant called him "the most esoteric" futurist, pointing out his interest in the Theosophical and occult literature. (Note: He read books of such authors as Helena Blavatsky, Rudolf Steiner, Franz Hartmann, and Charles Leadbeater.) Among his publications it can found those that contain cites from Thought-Forms and Man Visible and Invisible.

In 1908, Ginna painted a picture Neurasthenia that could be described as a piece of abstract art. In this painting, "he tried to portray a state of mind." (Note: See Neurasthenia (1908) by Ginna on this page.) Neurasthenia is the first thing of abstract painting, for it "preceded Kandinsky's first abstract water colour by two years."

=== Illustrators ===
In the esotericism researchers' opinion, illustrations to the book Thought-Forms, which were made by John Varley, Mr. Prince, and Miss Macfarlane, are "very reminiscent of much abstract and surrealistic painting" and "wouldn't look out of place hanging alongside early Malevich or Kandinsky abstractions." (Note: In T. H. Robsjohn-Gibbings' opinion, "many of the first abstract paintings...bear a striking resemblance to the thought forms.") Nevertheless, authors of the book fully directed a working of the artists who embodied their ideas and their vision. (Note: According to Godwin and Hanegraaff, the landscape painter John Varley was the grandson of John Varley the Elder (1778–1842). His wife, painter Isabella Varley, was the "aunt of W. B. Yeats, and it was she who in 1884 gave him a copy of Sinnett's Esoteric Buddhism.")

Count Maurice Prozor (1849–1928) has painted illustrations to Leadbeater's book Man Visible and Invisible.

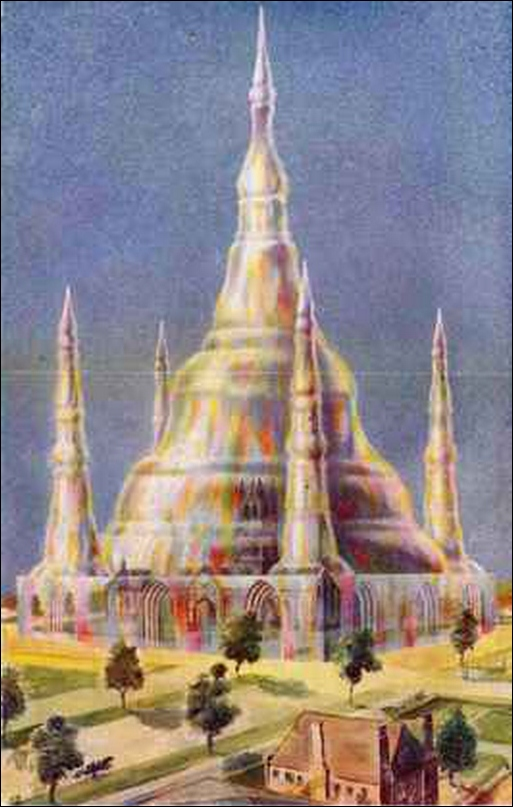
The Completed Eucharistic Form, from the book The Science of the Sacraments by C. W. Leadbeater (1920)

Alfred Edward Warner (1879–1968) had in Sydney his own commercial art studio. In 1923, he became a member of the Australian Painter-Etcher's Society and was in its Council at 1923–1925. In 1923, he was also one of the founders of the Australian Ex Libris Society. For several years Warner successfully collaborated with Leadbeater, illustrating his books, in particular, The Science of the Sacraments. On his illustration The Completed Eucharistic Form "the thought-form takes a mosque-like appearance with minarets rising from the church to envelop and influence the surrounding countryside." In preface to his Chakras, Leadbeter wrote that the "fine series of drawings" to the book was made by Edward Warner.

External images
- Illustrations to the Theosophical book Kingdom of the Gods.
- Plate 6 A Lord of the pines.
- Plate 12 A mountain God.
- Plate 15 The God of a snowclad range.
- Plate 18 A God of the southern pacific.
- Plate 20 An Angel of music.
- Plate 21 A rose Angel.
- Plate 22 A rose Angel (fragment).

In 1937, painter Ethelwynne M. Quail has performed illustrations to the Theosophical book Kingdom of the Gods based upon Geoffrey Hodson's "researches, carried out between 1921 and 1929." The book author noted, "As she has painted them to my descriptions, she is responsible only for their execution, not for their composition, colouring or form."

== Controversy ==
In 1947, Terence Harold Robsjohn-Gibbings (1905–1976), criticizing modern art, accused it of "vicious connection" with the occult. (Note: According to Robsjohn-Gibbings, abstract art is "a by-product of astral manifestation as revealed by Theosophy, spiritualism, and occultism.") Robsjohn-Gibbings' criticism was so "successful that, for decades, supporters of abstract art religiously avoided mentioning the esoteric connections of its pioneers." Interest in Theosophy of such abstract art leaders as Mondrian and Kandinsky was used "as a weapon" against modern art in general "by evangelical Christians and other critics."

The prejudgment against connection the sources of modern art with Theosophy still exists. (Note: Art philosopher Victor Bychkov stated that he self attitudes to Theosophy, Anthroposophy, and other esoteric teachings skeptically. In his opinion, esotericism did not contribute to the "creation of aesthetic values worthy of attention.") For example, art history scholar Yve-Alain Bois claimed that "the Theosophical nonsense with which the artist's mind was momentarily encumbered" disappeared quite rapidly from Mondrian's art, but Mondrian himself wrote: "I got everything from The Secret Doctrine." The "Inventing Abstraction, 1910–1925" exhibition at the New York Museum of Modern Art in 2012–2013 "completely ignored" the value of occultism and Theosophy. Art critic Waldemar Januszczak wrote on 7 February 2010:

The fact is, Theosophy... is embarrassing. If there is one thing you do not want your hardcore modernist to be, it is a member of an occult cult... Theosophy takes art into Dan Brown territory. No serious student of art history wants to touch it.

Januszczak claimed also that Theosophy was "fraudulent" and "ridiculous," and that "one day, someone will write a big book on the remarkable influence of Theosophy on modern art" and "its nonsensical spell" on so many modern artists. But, as Massimo Introvigne wrote, "conferences, publications, and exhibitions about Theosophy's influence on modern art continue at an increasing pace." (Note: See, for example, here.)

== See also ==
- Philosophy of art
- Theosophy and literature
- Thought-Forms
- "What Are The Theosophists?"
- "What Is Theosophy?"
- Western esotericism and the arts

== Sources ==
=== Academic publications ===
- Benezit Dictionary of Artists. Oxford University Press. 2011.
  - "Fuller, Florence". Benezit Dictionary of Artists. 2011. doi:10.1093/benz/9780199773787.article.B00401049.
  - "Ginna pseudonym of Corradini, Arnaldo Ginna Count". Benezit Dictionary of Artists. 2011. doi:10.1093/benz/9780199773787.article.B00074144.
  - "Klint, Hilma Af". Benezit Dictionary of Artists. 2011. doi:10.1093/benz/9780199773787.article.B00099420. ISBN 978-0-19-989991-3.
  - "Lechter, Melchior". Benezit Dictionary of Artists. 2011. doi:10.1093/benz/9780199773787.article.B00106100.
  - "Roerich, Nicolas or Rerikh, Nikolai Konstantinovich". Benezit Dictionary of Artists. doi:10.1093/benz/9780199773787.article.B00154582.
  - "Schmiechen, Hermann". Benezit Dictionary of Artists. 2011. doi:10.1093/benz/9780199773787.article.B00164079.
- Enchanted Modernities: Theosophy and the Arts in the Modern World (PDF). University of York. 25–27 September 2013. Archived from the original (PDF) on 2014-05-31.
- Theosophy and the Arts: Texts and Contexts of Modern Enchantment (PDF). University of York. 9–10 October 2015.
- Melton, J. G., ed. (2001a). "Machell, Reginald Willoughby (1854–1927)". Encyclopedia of Occultism and Parapsychology (5th ed.). Gale Group. p. 951. ISBN 0-8103-8570-8.
- ————, ed. (2001b). "Roerich, Nicholas K(onstantin) (1874–1947)". Encyclopedia of Occultism and Parapsychology (5th ed.). Gale Group. p. 1318. ISBN 0-8103-8570-8.
- ————, ed. (2001c). "Thoughtforms". Encyclopedia of Occultism and Parapsychology. Vol. 2 (5th ed.). Gale Group. pp. 1564–1566. ISBN 0-8103-8570-8.
- Alderton, Zoe (June 2011). "Colour, Shape, and Music: The Presence of Thought Forms in Abstract Art". Literature & Aesthetics. 21 (1). Sydney: Sydney Society of Literature and Aesthetics: 236–258. ISSN 2200-0437.
- Archer, Kenneth (2003). "Roerich, Nicholas". Grove Art Online. Oxford University Press. doi:10.1093/gao/9781884446054.article.T072668. ISBN 978-1-884446-05-4.
- Barasch, Moshe (1990). "Abstract Art: Origins and Sources". Modern Theories of Art: From impressionism to Kandinsky. NYU Press. pp. 293–308. ISBN 9780814712726.
- Barnett, Vivian Endicott (2003). "Kandinsky, Vasily [Vassily; Wassily] (Vasil'yevich)". Kandinsky, Vasily. Grove Art Online. Oxford University Press. doi:10.1093/gao/9781884446054.article.T045642. ISBN 9781884446054.
- Bauduin, Tessel M. (2012). "Science, Occultism, and the Art of the Avant-Garde in the Early Twentieth Century". Journal of Religion in Europe. 5 (1). Brill: 23–55. doi:10.1163/187489211X583797. ISSN 1874-8929.
- ———— (2013). "Abstract Art as "By-Product of Astral Manifestation": The Influence of Theosophy on Modern Art in Europe". In Hammer, O.; Rothstein, M. (eds.). Handbook of the Theosophical Current. Brill Handbooks on Contemporary Religion. Boston: Brill. pp. 429–452. ISBN 9789004235960.
- ———— (2014). "The Occult and the Visual Arts". In Partridge, C. (ed.). The Occult World. Routledge Worlds. Routledge. pp. 429–445. ISBN 9781317596769.
- Blotkamp, C. (2001). Mondrian: The Art of Destruction. Reaktion Books. ISBN 9781861891006.
- Bois, Y.-A. (1993) [1990]. Painting as Model (2nd ed.). MIT Press. ISBN 9780262521802.
- Bowlt, J. E.; Washton-Long, Rose-C. (1980). The Life of Vasilii Kandinsky in Russian Art: A Study of "On the Spiritual in Art" (2nd ed.). Oriental Research Partners. ISBN 9780892501311.
- Breen, B. (April 2014). Breen, B. (ed.). "Victorian Occultism and the Art of Synesthesia". The Appendix. 2 (2). Austin, TX: The Appendix, LLC: 109–114.
- Bris-Marino, Pablo (2014). "The influence of Theosophy on Mondrian's neoplastic work". Arte, Individuo y Sociedad. 26 (3). Madrid: Universidad Complutense de Madrid: 489–504. doi:10.5209/rev_ARIS.2014.v26.n3.42960. ISSN 1131-5598.
- Carlson, M. (2015) [1993]. "Orientologist and Painter Nikolai Konstantinovich Roerich (1874–1947)". No Religion Higher Than Truth: A History of the Theosophical Movement in Russia, 1875–1922. Princeton Legacy Library. Princeton University Press. pp. 193–198. ISBN 9781400872794.
- Celant, G. (January 1981). "Futurism and the Occult". Artforum. 19 (5). NYC: 36–42. ISSN 0004-3532.
- Chessa, L. (2012). Luigi Russolo, Futurist: Noise, Visual Arts, and the Occult. University of California Press. ISBN 9780520270640.
- Coen, Ester (2003). "Russolo, Luigi". Russolo, Luigi. Grove Art Online. Oxford University Press. doi:10.1093/gao/9781884446054.article.T074704.
- Davis, Ann (2003). "Theosophy [from Gr. theosophia: 'wisdom of God']". Theosophy. Grove Art Online. Oxford University Press. doi:10.1093/gao/9781884446054.article.T084484.
- Deveney, John P. (2001). "H. P. Blavatsky and Spirit Art". In Caron, R.; Godwin, J.; Hanegraaff, W. J. (eds.). Esotérisme, gnoses & imaginaire symbolique: mélanges offerts à Antoine Faivre. Peeters Publishers. pp. 525–546. ISBN 9789042909557.
- Ellwood, R. S. (2014) [1986]. Theosophy: A Modern Expression of the Wisdom of the Ages. Wheaton, Ill.: Quest Books. ISBN 9780835631457.
- French, B. J. (2000). The Theosophical Masters: An Investigation into the Conceptual Domains of H. P. Blavatsky and C. W. Leadbeater (PhD thesis). Sydney: University of Sydney. hdl:2123/7147.
- Gettings, Fred (1978). The hidden art: a study of occult symbolism in art. A studio vista book. Studio Vista. ISBN 9780289708491.
- Godwin, J. (2016). "Esoteric Theories of Color". In Forshaw, Peter J. (ed.). Lux in Tenebris: The Visual and the Symbolic in Western Esotericism. Aries Book Series. Brill. pp. 447–476. ISBN 9789004334953.
- Goodrick-Clarke, N. (2008). The Western Esoteric Traditions: A Historical Introduction. New York: Oxford University Press. ISBN 9780199717569.
- Guenther, Peter W. (2003). "Lechter, Melchior". Lechter, Melchior. Grove Art Online. Oxford University Press. doi:10.1093/gao/9781884446054.article.T049898.
- Hammer, O. (2003) [2001]. Claiming Knowledge: Strategies of Epistemology from Theosophy to the New Age (PhD thesis). Studies in the history of religions. Boston: Brill. ISBN 9789004136380.
- ———— (2014). "The Theosophical Current in the Twentieth Century". In Partridge, C. (ed.). The Occult World. Routledge Worlds. Routledge. pp. 348–360. ISBN 9781317596769.
- Hanegraaff, W. J. (2013). Western Esotericism: A Guide for the Perplexed. London: Bloomsbury. ISBN 9781441188977.
- ———— (2017). "The Theosophical Imagination". Correspondences. 5 (1): 3–39. ISSN 2053-7158.
- Henderson, Linda D. (2013) [1983]. The Fourth Dimension and Non-Euclidean Geometry in Modern Art (2nd ed.). MIT Press. ISBN 9780262582445.
- Henkels, H. (2003). "Mondrian [Mondriaan], Piet (er Cornelis)". Grove Art Online. Oxford University Press. doi:10.1093/gao/9781884446054.article.T059051. ISBN 978-1-884446-05-4.
- Introvigne, M. (2014a). "Reginald W. Machell (1854–1927): Blavatsky's Child, British Symbolist, American Artist". Aries. 14 (2). Brill: 165–189. doi:10.1163/15700593-01402002.
- ———— (2014b). Theosophy and the Visual Arts: The Nordic Connection (PDF). Torino: UPS.
- ———— (2014c). Arte magica L'influenza della Teosofia sull'arte moderna [Magic Art: The Influence of Theosophy on Modern Art] (PDF) (in Italian). Torino: UPS.
- ———— (2014d). Giacomo Balla (1871–1958) and the Theosophical "Art World" (PDF). Torino: UPS.
- ———— (2014e). "From Mondrian to Charmion von Wiegand: Neoplasticism, Theosophy and Buddhism". Black Mirror 0: Territory. pp. 47–59.
- ———— (2015). Painting the Masters: The Mystery of Hermann Schmiechen (PDF). Torino: UPS.
- ———— (2016a). "New Religious Movements and the Visual Arts". Nova Religio. 19 (4). University of California: 3–13. doi:10.1525/nr.2016.19.4.3. ISSN 1541-8480.
- ———— (2016b). Artists and Theosophy in Present-Day Czech Republic and Slovakia (PDF). Torino: UPS.
- ———— (2016c). The Mystery of Modern Art. Torino: UPS.
- ———— (2017a). "Painting the Masters in Britain: From Schmiechen to Scott". In Ferguson, C.; Radford, A. (eds.). The Occult Imagination in Britain: 1875–1947. Among the Victorians and Modernists. London: Routledge. pp. 206–226. ISBN 9781351168304.
- ———— (2017b). Annie Besant and the Portraits of the Masters (PDF). Torino: UPS.
- ———— (2018a). "The Sounding Cosmos Revisited". Nova Religio. 21 (3). University of California: 29–46. doi:10.1525/nr.2018.21.3.29. ISSN 1541-8480.
- ———— (2018b). Reginald W. Machell (1854–1927): A British Theosophical Artist in San Diego (PDF). Torino: UPS.
- Johnston, Jay (2012). "Theosophical Bodies: Colour, Shape and Emotion". In Cusack, C.; Norman, A. (eds.). Handbook of New Religions and Cultural Production. Brill Handbooks on Contemporary Religion. Brill. pp. 153–170. ISBN 9789004221871.
- Jones, Chelsea Ann (2012). The Role of Buddhism, Theosophy, and Science in František Kupka's Search for the Immaterial through 1909 (PDF) (M.A. thesis). Supervisor: Linda D. Henderson. Austin, Texas: University of Texas at Austin.
- Kamerling, Bruce (Fall 1980). Scharf, Thomas L. (ed.). "Theosophy and Symbolist Art". The Journal of San Diego History. 26 (4). San Diego, CA: San Diego Historical Society.
- Kandinsky, W. (1952) [1912]. Über das Geistige in der Kunst [On the Spiritual in Art] (PDF) (in German) (4th ed.). Bern: Benteli-Verlag.
- Kirkley, Evelyn A. (Winter 1997). Crawford, Richard W. (ed.). "Starved and Treated Like Convicts". The Journal of San Diego History. 43 (1). San Diego, CA: San Diego Historical Society.
- Kramer, H. (2013). The Triumph of Modernism. Rowman & Littlefield. ISBN 9781442223226.
- Lachman, G. (March 2008). "Kandinsky's Thought Forms and the Occult Roots of Modern Art". Quest. 96 (2). Theosophical Society in America: 57–61.
- Leland, Kurt (2016). Rainbow Body: A History of the Western Chakra System. Nicolas-Hays, Inc. ISBN 9780892546343.
- Lenz, Christian (2003). "Beckmann, Max". Beckmann, Max. Grove Art Online. Oxford University Press. doi:10.1093/gao/9781884446054.article.T007231. ISBN 978-1-884446-05-4.
- Lipsey, Roger (2011) [1988]. The Spiritual in Twentieth-Century Art. History of Art. Courier Corporation. ISBN 9780486432946.
- Majut, Rudolf (April 1959). "Melchior Lechter". German Life and Letters. 12 (3): 195–203. doi:10.1111/j.1468-0483.1959.tb00567.x.
- Martin, Marianne W. (1968). Futurist Art and Theory. Oxford: Clarendon Press.
- McFarlane, Jenny (2006). A Visionary Space: Theosophy and an Alternative Modernism in Australia 1890–1934 (PhD thesis). Canberra: Australian National University. hdl:1885/11007.
- ———— (2012a). "The Agency of the Object: Leadbeater and Pectoral Cross". In Cusack, C.; Norman, A. (eds.). Handbook of New Religions and Cultural Production. Brill Handbooks on Contemporary Religion. Brill. pp. 133–151. ISBN 9789004221871.
- Moszynska, Anna (2003). "Abstract art". Abstract art. Grove Art Online. Oxford University Press. doi:10.1093/gao/9781884446054.article.T000238. ISBN 9781884446054.
- Reimertz, S. (1995). Max Beckmann (in German) (2nd ed.). Rowohlt. ISBN 9783499505584.
- Ringbom, S. (1966). "Art in 'The Epoch of the Great Spiritual': Occult Elements in the Early Theory of Abstract Painting". Journal of the Warburg and Courtauld Institutes. 29. The Warburg Institute: 386–418. doi:10.2307/750725. JSTOR 750725. S2CID 194972876.
- ———— (1970). The Sounding Cosmos. Acta Academiae Aboensis. Åbo Akad.
- Robsjohn-Gibbings, T. H. (1947). Mona Lisa's Mustache: A Dissection of Modern Art. New York: Alfred A. Knopf.
- Rudbøg, Tim (2013). "Point Loma, Theosophy, and Katherine Tingley". In Hammer, O.; Rothstein, M. (eds.). Handbook of the Theosophical Current. Brill Handbooks on Contemporary Religion. Boston: Brill. pp. 51–72. ISBN 9789004235960.
- Santucci, J. A. (2012). "Theosophy". In Hammer, O.; Rothstein, M. (eds.). The Cambridge Companion to New Religious Movements. Cambridge Companions to Religion. Cambridge University Press. pp. 231–246. ISBN 9781107493551.
- Sasson, D. (2012). "Koot Hoomi's portrait". In Albanese, C. L.; Stein, S. J. (eds.). Yearning for the New Age: Laura Holloway-Langford and Late Victorian Spirituality. Religion in North America. Bloomington: Indiana University Press. pp. 142–144. ISBN 9780253001771.
- Sellon, E. B.; Weber, R. (1992). "Theosophy and The Theosophical Society". In Faivre, A.; Needleman, J. (eds.). Modern Esoteric Spirituality. New York: Crossroad Publishing Company. pp. 311–329. ISBN 0-8245-1145-X.
- Selz, P. H. (1964). Max Beckmann. Museum of Modern Art.
- ———— (1992). Max Beckmann: The Self-Portraits. Gagosian Gallery. ISBN 9780847816408.
- Seuphor, M. (1969). Piet Mondrian: Life and Work. New York: Harry N. Abrams.
- Sica, Paola (2017). "Iconoclastic Ginna". In Veivo, Harri; Montier, Jean-Pierre; Nicol, Françoise; Ayers, David; Hjartarson, Benedikt; Bru, Sascha (eds.). Beyond Given Knowledge: Investigation, Quest and Exploration in Modernism and the Avant-Gardes. Walter de Gruyter GmbH & Co KG. pp. 31–44. ISBN 9783110569230.
- Stasulane, Anita (2005). Theosophy and Culture: Nicholas Roerich. Interreligious and intercultural investigations. Roma: EPUG. ISBN 9788878390355.
- ———— (2013). "The Theosophy of the Roerichs". In Hammer, O.; Rothstein, M. (eds.). Handbook of the Theosophical Current. Brill Handbooks on Contemporary Religion. Boston: Brill. pp. 193–216. ISBN 9789004235977.
- Stottmeister, Jan (2013). "Theosophical Symbolism: Melchior Lechter (1865–1937)" (PDF). Enchanted Modernities: Theosophy and the Arts in the Modern World. University of York. p. 24.
- ———— (2014). Der George-Kreis und die Theosophie [The George Circle and Theosophy] (in German). Wallstein. ISBN 9783835311978.
- Tillett, Gregory (2016). The Elder Brother: A Biography of Charles Webster Leadbeater. Routledge. ISBN 9781317311324.
- Treitel, Corinna (2004). "Theosophy and the Avant-Garde". A Science for the Soul: Occultism and the Genesis of the German Modern. Baltimore; London: Johns Hopkins University Press. pp. 124–131. ISBN 9780801878121.
- Washton-Long, Rose-Carol (1975). "Kandinsky's Abstract Style: The Veiling of Apocalyptic Folk Imagery". Art Journal. 34 (3). College Art Association: 217–228. doi:10.1080/00043249.1975.10793685. ISSN 0004-3249. JSTOR 775993.
- ———— (1980). Kandinsky: The Development of an Abstract Style. Oxford studies in the history of art and architecture. Clarendon Press. ISBN 9780198173113.
- ———— (1987). "Occultism, Anarchism, and Abstraction: Kandinsky's Art of the Future". Art Journal. 46 (1). College Art Association: 38–45. doi:10.1080/00043249.1987.10792337. ISSN 0004-3249. JSTOR 776841.
- ———— (2013). "Back to Barr: MoMA's 2013 origins of Abstraction" (PDF). Enchanted Modernities: Theosophy and the Arts in the Modern World. University of York. p. 2.
- Weinzweig, Paul (1978). "An Appreciation of Helena Blavatsky". Rikka. 5 (4). Toronto. OCLC 173878989.
- Welsh, Robert P. (1987). "Mondrian and Theosophy". In Regier, Kathleen J. (ed.). The Spiritual Image in Modern Art. Theosophical Publishing House. pp. 164–189. ISBN 9780835606219.
- Wittlich, Petr (2003). "Kupka, František". Grove Art Online. Oxford University Press. doi:10.1093/gao/9781884446054.article.T048316. ISBN 978-1-884446-05-4.
- Wolters, F. (1911). Melchior Lechter (in German). München: Franz Hanfstaengl.
- Wünsche, Isabel (2016). "Wassily Kandinsky and František Kupka". In Wünsche, Isabel; Gronemeyer, Wiebke (eds.). Practices of Abstract Art: Between Anarchism and Appropriation. Cambridge Scholars Publishing. pp. 11–30. ISBN 9781443856867.

=== Other publications ===
- Bax, Marty (3 December 2014). "The Story of Count Prozor". Theosophy Forward.
- Beckmann, M. "Sketches for Frühe Menschen". Beckmann Sketchbook. Washington, D.C.: National Gallery of Art.
- Ellwood, R. S. (15 March 2012). "Leadbeater, Charles Webster". Theosopedia. Manila: Theosophical Publishing House.
- Godwin, J. (5 February 2013). "Art, Theosophy and". Theosopedia. Manila: Theosophical Publishing House.
- Hanegraaff, W. J. (22 October 2015). "Theosophy in Secret Germany". Creative Reading.
- Januszczak, W. (7 February 2010). "Theo van Doesburg Made It Hip to Be Square". The Sunday Times. London.
- ———— (8 June 2014). "Neo Plastic Fantastic". The Sunday Times. London.
- Knoche, Grace F. (15 March 2012). "Machell, Reginald Willoughby". Theosopedia. Manila: Theosophical Publishing House.

=== In Russian ===
- Боулт, Дж. Э. (1999). "Василий Кандинский и теософия" [Wassily Kandinsky and Theosophy]. Многогранный мир Кандинского [The Many-sided World of Kandinsky] (in Russian). М.: Наука. pp. 30–41.
- Бычков, В. В. [in Russian] (2007). "Эзотерика и искусство" [Esotericism and the Arts]. In Бычков, В. В. [in Russian] (ed.). Триалог. Разговор первый об эстетике, современном искусстве и кризисе культуры [A Trialogue: The First Talk on Aesthetics, Modern Arts, and a Crisis of Culture] (PDF) (in Russian). Москва: ИФ РАН. pp. 50–59. ISBN 978-5-9540-0087-0.
- Иванов, В. В. (2007). "Теософия и искусство" [Theosophy and the Arts]. In Бычков, В. В. [in Russian] (ed.). Триалог. Разговор первый об эстетике, современном искусстве и кризисе культуры [A Trialogue: The First Talk on Aesthetics, Modern Arts, and a Crisis of Culture] (PDF) (in Russian). Москва: ИФ РАН. pp. 79–84. ISBN 978-5-9540-0087-0.
- ———— (2009). "О герметизме и эзотерике в искусстве" [On Hermeticism and Esotericism in the Arts]. In Бычков, В. В. [in Russian] (ed.). Триалог. Разговор второй о философии искусства [A Trialogue: The Second Talk on Philosophy of Art] (PDF) (in Russian). Москва: ИФ РАН. pp. 154–173. ISBN 978-5-9540-0134-1.
- ———— (2012). "О герметизме и эзотерике в искусстве" [On Hermeticism and Esotericism in the Arts]. In Бычков, В. В. [in Russian] (ed.). Триалог: Живая эстетика и современная философия искусства [A Trialogue: The Living Aesthetics and Modern Philosophy of Art] (in Russian). Москва: Прогресс-Традиция. pp. 270–284. ISBN 9785898263256.
- Бычков, В. В. [in Russian], ed. (2012). "Участники триалога" [Trialogue participants]. Триалог: Живая эстетика и современная философия искусства [A Trialogue: The Living Aesthetics and Modern Philosophy of Art] (in Russian). Москва: Прогресс-Традиция. pp. 838–839. ISBN 9785898263256.
- Фаликов, Б. З. (2016). Молок, Н. Ю. (ed.). "Астральный цвет: Кандинский и теософия" [Astral Color: Kandinsky and Theosophy] (PDF). Искусствознание (in Russian) (1–2). М.: ГИИ: 66–89. ISSN 2073-316X.

=== Theosophical publications ===
- Besant, A. (1899) [1897]. The Ancient Wisdom (PDF) (2nd ed.). London: Theosophical Publishing Society.
- Besant, A.; Leadbeater, C. W. (1905). Thought-Forms. London: Theosophical Publishing Society.
- Blavatsky, H. P. (1877). Isis Unveiled. Vol. 1. New York: J. W. Bouton.
- ———— (1877a). Isis Unveiled. Vol. 2. New York: J. W. Bouton. p. 610.
- ———— (1889). The Key to Theosophy (PDF). London: Theosophical Publishing Company.
- Cranston, S. L. (1993). HPB: the extraordinary life and influence of Helena Blavatsky, founder of the modern Theosophical movement. G.P. Putnam's Sons. ISBN 9780874776881.
- de Purucker, G., ed. (1999). "Dweller on the Threshold". Encyclopedic Theosophical Glossary. Theosophical University Press. ISBN 978-1-55700-141-2.
- Hodson, G. (2007) [1952]. Kingdom of the Gods. Illustrated by Ethelwynne M. Quail (13th ed.). Adyar: Theosophical Publishing House. ISBN 978-0766181342.
- Leadbeater, C. W. (1895). The Astral Plane (PDF). London: Theosophical Publishing Society.
- ———— (1903) [1902]. Man Visible and Invisible (PDF). New York: John Lane.
- ———— (1913). The Hidden Side of Things. Adyar: Theosophical Publishing House.
- ———— (1920). The Science of the Sacraments. The St. Alban press.
- ———— (1927). Chakras (PDF). Adyar: Theosophical Publishing House.
- Machell, Reginald W. (1980). "The Path". In Zirkoff, B. De (ed.). Blavatsky Collected Writings. Vol. 12. Wheaton, Ill: Theosophical Publishing House. pp. 354–355.
- ————. "The Path print". Theosophical University Press Catalog. Pasadena, CA: Theosophical University Press.
- Schuré, É. (1921) [1889]. Les Grands Initiés. Esquisse de l'histoire secrète des religions [The Great Initiates: A Study of the Secret History of Religions] (in French). Paris.
- Steiner, R. (1989) [1909]. Die Geheimwissenschaft im Umriss [An Outline of Occult Science] (in German). Dornach: Rudolf Steiner Verlag. ISBN 3-7274-0130-3.
- ———— (1994) [1904]. Theosophy: An Introduction to the Spiritual Processes in Human Life and in the Cosmos. New York: Anthroposophic Press. ISBN 0-88010-373-6.
- ———— (2004) [1905]. Knowledge of the Higher Worlds: How is it Achieved?. Rudolf Steiner Press. ISBN 9781855841437.
