= Yuri Krivonogov =

Ukrainian engineer (born 1941)

- Юрий Андреевич Кривоногов
- Born: May 15, 1941 (age 85); Staraya Kriusha, Voronezh Oblast, Soviet Union
- Citizenship: Soviet Union, Ukraine
- Known for: Founder of the "Institute of the Soul 'Atma'" (White Brotherhood)
- Spouse: Marina Tsvigun
- Scientific career
- Fields: Cybernetics, engineering

Yuri Andreevich Krivonogov (born 15 May 1941, village of Staraya Kriusha, Voronezh Oblast) is a Soviet and Ukrainian cybernetics engineer, a Candidate of Technical Sciences, and the founder and leader of the "Institute of the Soul 'Atma'" (the White Brotherhood). He collaborated with a secret department of the Soviet KGB that studied mass consciousness manipulation.

== Biography ==
He was born on 15 May 1941 in Voronezh Oblast. A cybernetics engineer by training, he defended his Candidate of Sciences dissertation in 1978 at the Kharkiv Institute of Radioelectronics (the dissertation dealt with operational dispatch control systems). He worked at the Institute of Clinical and Experimental Medicine in Novosibirsk and cooperated with the Mykolaiv Center of Psychotronics, where, under the aegis of the KGB, an “antidote” to the CIA’s mind‑control projects was being prepared. During perestroika he suddenly abandoned his scientific career and became a Hare Krishna devotee. After a while he left the International Society for Krishna Consciousness and in 1990 founded his own organization, the “Institute of the Soul ‘Atma’”, which later became known as the “White Brotherhood”.

Krivonogov and his wife, a former Komsomol activist Marina Tsvigun, declared themselves deities and developed their own eclectic religious teaching, “Yusmalos”. A central element of this teaching was an intense expectation of the end of the world, when the “children of Satan – the Immanuelites” would perish and the Yusmalians would live an endless life in the paradise that would be established on earth. Marina Tsvigun acted as the “living god”, called Maria Devi Christos, while Krivonogov appointed himself “God’s vicar on earth Yuoann Svami” and patriarch of the “Brotherhood”.

Adherents of the sect were persuaded that the time of humanity's existence was coming to an end and that it was necessary to resist the Antichrist with all one's strength. This resistance would be possible only if a person refrained from obtaining an education, working, taking part in public life, keeping electronic equipment at home, marrying, or having children, so as not to hand them over to the Antichrist later. By using methods of active psychological pressure, the organisers drove their followers into frenzied fanaticism. Rank-and-file adherents were forced to sell their apartments for the benefit of the sect. As a result, hundreds of people who fell under the influence of the Krivonogovs were left homeless. The institute began to grow rapidly, soon went beyond the borders of Ukraine, where it had been founded, and spread across Russia and Belarus.

The arrival of the Last Judgment, after which the Brotherhood would enjoy paradise on earth while all other people perished in flames, was set for the autumn of 1993. In November, almost all the sect's members gathered in Kyiv, where they expected to meet the end of the world, and seized Saint Sophia Cathedral. Krivonogov and Tsvigun, as well as the most active members of the sect, were arrested by the Kyiv police. In 1996, Krivonogov and Tsvigun were sentenced to long prison terms: Krivonogov to 7 years, and Tsvigun to 4 years of imprisonment.

After his release from the colony, Krivonogov gave up “missionary work” and contact with the “brothers”, tried to find a job as a university lecturer, and later worked at a department store in Kyiv. After divorcing Tsvigun, he took the surname of his new wife, becoming Yuri Silvestrov.

== See also ==
- Dmytro Korchynsky
- MKUltra

== Literature ==
- Abyzova, L. V.; Poludenko, S. V. (2008). "Topic 16. Modern Non-Traditional Religions". In Mozgovoy, L. I.; Buchma, O. V. (eds.). Religious Studies: A Textbook (PDF) (2nd ed.). Kyiv: Center for Educational Literature. pp. 236–253. ISBN 978-966-364-955-9. Archived from the original (PDF) on 2013-04-02.
- Balagushkin, E. G. (1999). "Chapter IV. The Great White Brotherhood — YuSMALOS". Non-Traditional Religions of Modern Russia: A Morphological Analysis (PDF). Vol. 1. Moscow: Institute of Philosophy, Russian Academy of Sciences. ISBN 5-201-02012-7. Copy 1, Copy 2
- Brits, G. (2008). "White Brotherhood". In Dremlyug, Yu. (ed.). Religious Movements and Sects: A Handbook. St. Petersburg: Militia Dei. Archived from the original on 2013-05-08.
- Grigoryeva, L. I. (2002). "White Brotherhood YuSMALOS". In Mchedlov, M. P.; Averyanov, Yu. I.; Basilov, V. N. (eds.). Religions of the Peoples of Modern Russia: A Dictionary (2nd, revised and enlarged ed.). Moscow: Respublika. pp. 41–43. ISBN 5-250-01818-1.
- Dvorkin, A. L. (2006). "Chapter 18. 'The White Brotherhood'". Sectology. Totalitarian Sects. An Attempt at Systematic Research (3rd, revised and expanded ed.). Nizhny Novgorod: Christian Library. pp. 633–643. ISBN 5-88213-050-6.
- Lunkin, R. N. (2008). "The White Brotherhood: From the End of the World to Family Happiness". The Russian Review (27). Keston Institute: 9. Archived from the original on 2013-11-09. (also published in Religion and Law, 2008, no. 3, pp. 24–29)
- Falikov, B. Z. (2007). "White Brotherhood". Cults and Culture: From Helena Blavatsky to Ron Hubbard. Moscow: RSUH. pp. 228–242.
- Chaikovsky, A. E.; Kapochkina, N. A.; Kudryavtsev, M. S. (2001). "Chapter 11. New Religious Movements 'White Brotherhood'". History of Religions. Textbook. Nizhny Novgorod: NSTU. Archived from the original on 2015-12-08.
