= White Brotherhood (disambiguation) =

White Brotherhood is an urban society (or militia) in Toulouse, France, established in 1211.

White Brotherhood may refer to:

- Great White Brotherhood, belief systems akin to Theosophy and New Age, pioneered in the late eighteenth century by Karl von Eckartshausen
- Universal White Brotherhood, a New Age-oriented religious movement founded in Bulgaria in the early 20th century by Peter Deunov
- White Brotherhood, a branch of the Ku Klux Klan; see Wyatt Outlaw
- White Brotherhood (religious group), originating in Ukraine

== See also ==
- Marina Tsvigun, co-founder of the New Community of Enlightened Humanity, also known as the White Brotherhood
