= Boris Falikov =

Soviet-Russian historian and publicist

Dr. Boris Falikov
- Фаликов, Борис
- Born: September 24, 1947 (age 79); Holmsk, Sakhalin region, Russian Federation
- Education: Saratov Pedagogical University, Institute for US and Canadian Studies
- Scientific career
- Fields: Comparative cultural studies, Religious studies, History of religions
- Workplaces: "Centre of Religion Studies" at RSUH
- Thesis: Socio-political aspects of some religious movements in the US (hinduism and buddhism) (1985)
- Doctoral advisor: Dmitri Furman

Boris Zinoviyevich Falikov (Russian: Борис Зиновьевич Фаликов, born September 24, 1947, in Holmsk, Sakhalin region, Russian Federation) is a Soviet and Russian historian and publicist, specializing in the field of new religions. He is an assistant professor at the Centre for Religious Studies at the Russian State University for the Humanities with a Ph.D. in history sciences. He is the younger brother of the poet and writer Falikov, Illya Zenoviyevich.

== Biography ==
Falikov was born on 24 September 1947 in the town of Holmsk of the Sakhalin region. The Falikovs came from Vladivostok to Sakhalin island where the head of the family served as an assistant director in the Sakhalin Science and Research Institute of Fish Industry and Oceanography. Falikov's father was promoted as the director of the institute but soon after the Falikovs left the island for mainland in 1949.

Falikov graduated from the faculty of foreign languages of Saratov Pedagogical Institute. Following his graduation, he joined the Institute of USA and Canada with the Russian Academy of Sciences as teaching staff. There, in 1985, under the supervision of Furman D. E., he defended a historical sciences PhD candidate's thesis about "Socio-political aspects of some religious movements in the US (Hinduism and Buddhism)" (the national standard specialty code for which is 07.00.03 — «Generic history»). He has worked in the Orientalist Institute with the Russian Academy of Sciences, in the department of comparative cultural studies, where he's been studying the phenomenon of spreading of Hinduism and Buddhism in the Western culture. During the early 1990s, he taught at the Lewis & Clark College, University of Georgetown and the University of Kansas.

In 1997–1998, he was the OSCE expert on issues of freedom of religion. Since 1999, he is an assistant professor at Russian State University for the Humanities (RSUH). He teaches at the RSUH "Centre of Religion Studies" (a course in "Modern non-traditional religious doctrines and cults") and is head of the international department in the Kultura newspaper. Falikov is the author of 4 monographs: "Religion as part of political life in the US" (1985), "Neo-Hinduism and the Western culture" (1994), "Christianity and other religions" (1999), "Cults and culture: from Helena Blavatsky to Ron Hubbard" (2007).

From 2000 to 2002, he was the chief editor of the internet portal "World of religions". His publicist works on the problems of religion and culture were printed in the magazines Kontinent (Russian: Континент), Znamya (Russian: Знамя), Novy Mir (Russian: Новый мир), The New Times (Russian: Новое время), "Summaries}" (Russian: Итоги), "Everyday magazine" (Russian: Ежедневный журнал), "Profile" (Russian: Профиль), "Volga" (Russian: Волга), newspapers: "Thought of a Russian mind" (Russian: Русская мысль), Nezavisimaya Gazeta (Russian: Независимая газета), Izvestia (Russian: Известия), Vremya Novostei (Russian: Время новостей), "Kultura" (Russian: Культура), Moskovskiye Novosti (Russian: Московские новости), internet newspapers and publications Gazeta.Ru, Grani.ru, GlobalRus.ru, "World of religions" (Russian: Мир религий), Russian Journal (Russian: Русский журнал).

== Bibliography ==
Books:

- Furman, D. E.; Filatov, S. B. [in Russian]; Falikov B. Z. (1985). Zamoshkin, Y. A. [in Russian]; Furman, D. E. (eds.). Религия в политической жизни США (70-е — нач. 80-х гг.) [Religion as part of political life in the US (70s - early 80s)] (PDF). Vol. 4000. Moscow: Nauka. p. 225.
- Falikov, B. Z. (1994). Неоиндуизм и западная культура [Neo-hinduism and western culture]. Moscow: Nauka. p. 219. ISBN 978-5-02-017680-5.
- —— (2007). Культы и культура: от Елены Блаватской до Рона Хаббарда [Cults and culture: from Helena Blavatsky to Ron Hubbard]. Moscow: RSUH. p. 264. ISBN 978-5-7281-0990-7.
- —— (2007). Falikov B. Z. (ed.). Судьба громоотвода [Fate of the thunder arrester]. Cults and culture: From Helena Blavatsky to Ron Hubbard (in Russian). Moscow: RSUH. pp. 148–169. Archived from the original on 2016-08-19.

== Further reading and external links ==
- Boris Falikov on Facebook
- All Falikov's publications on Stengazeta.net (in Russian)
- All publications in Gazeta.ru (in Russian)
- Minin, S. (2008-02-20). Лики «новой религиозности». Falikov B. Z. Культы и культура: от Елены Блаватской до Рона Хаббарда. – М.: РГГУ, 2007. – 265 с. [The faces of "new religiosity" in Boris Falikov's book "Cults and cultures: from Helena Blavatsky to Ron Hubbard"]. НГ-Религии (in Russian).
- "Krishna Holy Book Faces Ban in Tomsk". 28 November 2011.
- "Putin to seek friendly ear with pope visit".
- "Moscow Patriarchate's loss of Ukrainian churches will render 'Russian world' idea a purely militant nationalism, Falikov says -Euromaidan Press". Euromaidan Press. 2015-06-24.
- "Surrounded by Mormons".
- Falikov B. Z. (2014-12-08). "Почему Папа Франциск и Патриарх Кирилл (Гундяев) не встретятся в ближайшем будущем" [Why Pope Francis and Patriarch Kirill will not meet in near future]. Gazeta.ru.
- Falikov B. Z. (2002-03-25). "Why RPTs should not fight catholics" [Why RPTs should not fight catholics]. Vremya Novostei. Archived from the original on 2016-08-20.
- Paul Goble (2012-10-23). "Moscow's 'Selective Secularism' Counterproductive, Analyst Says".

== Critics ==
- Bitten, Natasha The orthodox orientalist Borist Falikov believes, that emansipation of women causes terrorism // Demagogy.ru (in Russian)
- Kolymagin, B. F. Boris Falikov "Cults and cultures: from Helena Blavatsky to Ron Hubbard" (book review) // Portal-Credo.Ru (in Russian)
- Smirnov, I. V. "Cults and Culture". The ironical approach. Boris Falikov "Cults and cultures: from Helena Blavatsky to Ron Hubbard" (book review) //«Скепсис», 02.07.2008 (in Russian).
- Alexander Dvorkin Melitopol — London or travel notes by Boris Falikov // Centre of religious studies of Mart. Iriney Lionski, 2000 (in Russian).
- Alexander Dvorkin, Mikhailov Anatoly Controversy with Boris Falikov. The adventures of Ron Hubbard in Russia, or ideology instead of science // Nezavisimaya Gazeta, 14.06.2001, translation (copy on the website of Centre of religious studies of Mart. Iriney Lionski, 2004 (in Russian).
- Alexander Dvorkin Congrats, you lie again.. (Поздравляю, опять соврамши…) // Centre of religious studies of Mart. Iriney Lionski, 2011 (in Russian).
- Alexander Dvorkin Boris Falikov Anatomy of a Myth (book review).
