= Sixten Ringbom =

Finnish art historian (1935–1992)

- Born: 27 July 1935; Turku
- Died: 18 August 1992; Turku
- Citizenship: Finland
- Education: Åbo Akademi University
- Occupations: art historian, professor
- Notable work: The Sounding Cosmos (1970)
- Children: Veronika Ringbom
- Father: Lars-Ivar Ringbom

Sixten Ivar Alexander Ringbom (July 27, 1935 – August 18, 1992) was a Finnish art historian.

== Biography ==
External image
- Sixten Ringbom.

Sixten Ringbom was the son of Lars-Ivar Ringbom, a professor of art history at Åbo Akademi University. He studied at the Swedish classical lyceum (Swedish: Svenska klassiska lyceum) in Turku, then at the Åbo Akademi University among students of his father. In 1965, Sixten received his PhD. A supervisor his doctoral thesis was art historian Ernst Gombrich. In 1970, Ringbom succeeded his father as professor of art history at Åbo Akademi University.

Ringbom became the first scientist who has supposed an existence of a connection between early abstract art and occultism. He published his conjectures in an article "Art in 'The Epoch of the Great Spiritual': Occult Elements in the Early Theory of Abstract Painting" (1966) and in a book The Sounding Cosmos: A Study in the Spiritualism of Kandinsky and the Genesis of Abstract Painting (1970). According to WorldCat, he had written 93 works. (Note: "Works: 93 works in 255 publications in 9 languages and 1,484 library holdings.") From 1969 to 1973, he was the chief editor of Finsk Tidskrift, he was also the editor of a book Konsten i Finland [Art in Finland].

== Published works ==
=== Books ===
- Icon to Narrative. The Rise of the Dramatic Close-Up in Fifteenth-Century Devotional Painting (1965)
- The Sounding Cosmos. A Study in the Spiritualism of Kandinsky and the Genesis of Abstract Painting (1970)
- Konsten i Finland: från medeltid till nutid (1978)
- Kandinsky und 'Der Blaue Reiter'. German Art of the 20th Century (1985)
- Art History in Finland before 1920 (1986)
- Stone, Style and Truth. The Vogue for Natural Stone in Nordic Architecture 1880−1910 (1987)
- Pinta ja syvyys: esseitä (1989)

=== Selected articles ===
- "'Maria in Sole' and the Virgin of the Rosary" (1962)
- "Plato on Images" (1965)
- "Art in 'The Epoch of the Great Spiritual': Occult Elements in the Early Theory of Abstract Painting" (1966)
- "Devotional Images and Imaginative Devotions" (1969)
- "Paul Klee and the Inner Truth to Nature" (1977)
- "Transcending the Visible" (1985)
- "Action and Report. The Problem of Indirect Narration in the Academic Theory of Painting" (1988)

== See also ==
- Theosophy and visual arts
