= Geoffrey Hodson =

English occultist & writer (1886-1983)

- Born: 12 March 1886 Lincolnshire, England
- Died: 23 January 1983 (aged 96) Auckland, New Zealand

Geoffrey Hodson (12 March 1886 in Lincolnshire – 23 January 1983 in Auckland, New Zealand) was an occultist, Theosophist, Co-Freemason, mystic, Liberal Catholic priest, philosopher and esotericist, and a leading light for over 70 years in the Theosophical Society.

== Early life ==
Hodson was educated in England.

According to Hodson, his occult experiences began when he was about five or six years old. He had dream experiences in the half waking state and this seemed to be connected with Kundalini, the power of life and one of the great forces also known as the "Serpent Fire".

He served in the British Army as an officer and tank commander during the First World War. Subsequently, he spent his life as an anti-war activist through his teachings and insights. Following demobilisation he married Miss Jane Carter and he joined the YMCA Secretariat.

== Angelic visionary ==
It was around this time he met Mary De La Middleton, who said that her own master, the Master Rakoczy, had instructed her to show him how to awaken clairvoyance when required, focus it at different levels, project energies and heal others. It was at this stage Geoffrey Hodson with his wife toured Lancashire on his motorcycle and sidecar making detailed notes on the various types of fairies and nature spirits there. This culminated when he was on holiday in the valley of Sheepscombe where he and his wife claimed to have studied the angelic kingdom and that he received teachings from a high angel. This was the beginning of his work with the angelic kingdom. He wrote many books about his investigations there and the angelic teachings given him throughout his life.

== South Africa, Australia and New Zealand ==
In 1937 he traveled to South Africa to stay with friends Mr and Mrs Quail and their daughter Ethelwynne, who was an artist. Under Hodson's direction she painted the illustrations for his book, The Kingdom of the Gods. Hodson then went to Australia to be with his wife Jane, who since 1929 had progressive paralysis due to multiple sclerosis. She died in 1962. He served there as president of the Blavatsky Lodge, while a Perth theosophist Miss Sandra Chase took care of his wife. In 1940 he was invited by the New Zealand lodge to tour their main centres. While there he became founder and president of the New Zealand Vegetarian Society in 1943. He was also elected president of the Council of Combined Animal Welfare Organisations of New Zealand.

== India and America ==
Hodson also served as the director of studies of the School of the Wisdom at the International Headquarters of the Theosophical Society at Adyar, Chennai in India, for four sessions, in 1953–54, then in 1954-1955 and again in 1961. Hodson was a guest lecturer at the Krotona School of Theosophy in Ojai, California.

== Writing ==
Hodson was the author more than 50 books on spirituality, many being still in print. He wrote on psychic powers, Theosophy, Spiritualism, mysticism, fairies, angels, meditation, clairvoyance, health and disease.

He also wrote over two hundred articles and radio talks and travelled the world lecturing for the Theosophical Society.

He was awarded the Subba Row Gold Medal in 1954 for his contributions to Theosophical literature.

There are also several posthumous publications, such as Light of The Sanctuary - the Occult Diary of Geoffrey Hodson. Published by his wife Sandra Hodson. Other books published based on his notes and diaries were: Yogic Ascent to Spiritual Heights, Illuminations of the Mystery Traditions.

== Death ==
He gave his last lecture on 4 May 1982 at HPB Lodge in Auckland, aged 96. Eight months later he died in Auckland, on 23 January 1983.

== Bibliography ==
Works by Geoffrey Hodson:

- Faeries at Work and at Play, 1925
- The Kingdom of Faerie, 1927
- The Science of Seership 1927
- The Brotherhood of Angels and of Men, 1927
- First Steps on the Path, 1928
- The Angelic Hosts, 1928
- Be Ye Perfect, 1928
- Angels and the New Race, 1929
- American Lectures, 1929
- Thus Have I Heard, 1929
- The Miracle of Birth, 1929
- The Inner Side of Church Worship, 1930
- An Occult View of Health and Disease 1930
- New Light on the Problem of Disease 1930
- Some Experiments in Four Dimensional Vision, 1933
- The Coming of the Angels, 1935
- Destiny, 1936
- The Seven Human Temperaments, 1952
- Man, the Triune God, 1952
- Kingdom of the Gods, 1952
- Through the Gateway of Death: A Message to the Bereaved, 1953
- Theosophy Answers Some Problems of Life, 1953
- Pathway to Perfection, 1954
- Occult Powers in Nature and in Man, 1955
- Lecture Notes: The School of the Wisdom, 1955
- Vital Questions Answered, 1959
- The Soul's Awakening: Talks on Occultism and the Occult Life, 1963
- Hidden Wisdom in the Holy Bible, 1963–1980
- Man's Supersensory and Spiritual Powers, 1964
- Reincarnation, Fact or Fallacy?, 1967
- Meditations on the Occult Life, 1968
- The Supreme Splendour, 1967
- The Priestly Ideal, 1971
- The Call to the Heights: Guidance on the Pathway to Self-Illumination, 1975
- Christ Life from Nativity to Ascension, 1975
- Music Forms: Superphysical Effects of Music Clairvoyantly Observed, 1976
- At the Sign of the Square and Compass, 1976
- Clairvoyant Investigations of Christian Origins, 1977
- Basic Theosophy: The Living Wisdom (condensed from Lecture Notes), 1981
- The Concealed Wisdom in World Mythology, 1983
- Clairvoyant Investigations, 1984
- The Occult Philosophy Concealed within Freemasonry, 1985

Posthumus Publications:

- Light of The Sanctuary - The Occult Diary of Geoffrey Hodson, 1988
- Yogic Ascent to Spiritual Heights, 1991
- Illuminations of The Mystery Tradition, 1992
- Sharing The Light - The collected Articles of Geoffrey Hodson, 2008
- An Introduction to The Initiate Life, 2018
- The Ancient Mysteries, 2020

== See also ==
- Cottingley Fairies
