= John Ellis Bowlt =

British art historian

John. E. Bowlt
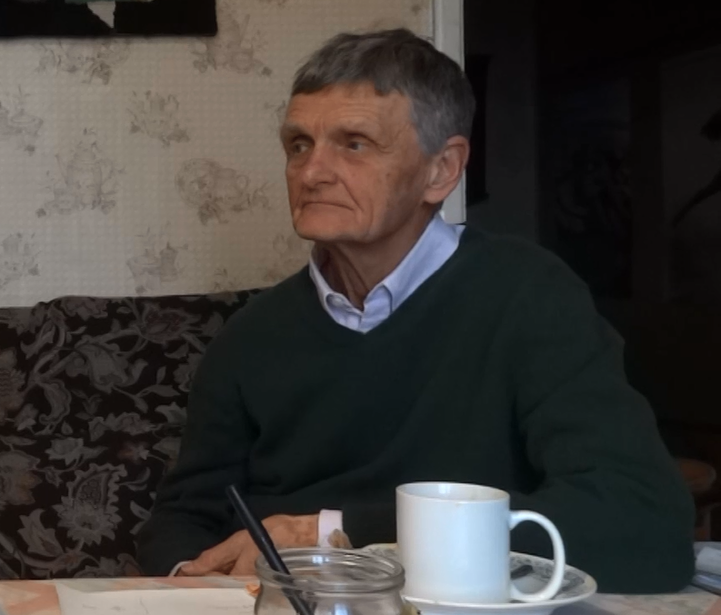
- Bowlt in 2015
- Born: John Ellis Bowlt; 6 December 1943 (age 82)
- Occupation: Art historian
- Awards: 2016 ASEEES Distinguished Contributions to Slavic, East European, and Eurasian Studies Award

John Ellis Bowlt (born 6 December 1943) is a former British art historian specialising in the Russian avant garde.

== Career ==
Bowlt is a professor at the University of Southern California and directs its Institute of Modern Russian Culture.

In 2009, Bowlt received the Order of Friendship from former Russian President Dmitry Medvedev. He has received numerous awards and scholarships, including the Woodrow Wilson National Fellowship and Fulbright-Hays Awards.

== Selected publications ==
- Russian Art of the Avant-Garde: Theory and Criticism 1902–1934. Thames and Hudson, London, 1988. (Documents of Twentieth-Century Art)
- Masterpieces of Russian Stage Design: 1880–1930. Antique Collectors Club, 2012.
- Kazimir Malevich, 1878–1935. University of Washington Press, 1991.
- Bowlt, John E. (1982). The Silver Age: Russian art of the early twentieth century and the "World of Art" group (2 ed.). Newtonville, Massachusetts: Oriental Research Partners. ISBN 0-89250-088-3.
- Bowlt, John E. (1989). "Manufacturing Dreams: Textile Design in Revolutionary Russia". Revolutionary Costume: Soviet Clothing and Textiles of the 1920s. New York City: Rizzoli International Publications. pp. 17–32. ISBN 0-8478-1053-4.
- Bowlt, John E.; Matich, Olga, eds. (1999). Laboratory of Dreams: Russian Avant-garde and Cultural Experiment. Stanford, California: Stanford University Press. ISBN 0-8047-3652-9.
- Bowlt, John E. (2008). Moscow & St. Petersburg 1900-1920 : art, life & culture of the Russian silver age. New York City: Vendome Press. ISBN 978-0-86565-191-3.

=== Exhibition Catalogues ===
- Bowlt, John E. (1982). Bowlt, John E. (ed.). Russian Stage Design: Scenic Innovation, 1900-1930 : From the Collection of Mr. & Mrs. Nikita D. Lobanov-Rostovsky. Jackson, Mississippi: Mississippi Museum of Art.
- Bowlt, John E.; Drutt, Matthew, eds. (2000). Amazons of the Avant-garde: Alexandra Exter, Natalia Goncharova, Liubov Popova, Olga Rozanova, Varvara Stepanova and Nadezhda Udaltsova. New York City: Guggenheim Museum Publications. ISBN 0-89207-225-3.
