= Moskovskiye Novosti =

Russian-language newspaper

Moskovskiye Novosti (Московские новости)
- Type: Daily newspaper
- Editor: Vladimir Semyonovich Gurevich
- Founded: 1980
- Ceased publication: February 2014
- Language: Russian
- Headquarters: Moscow, Russia
- Website: mn.ru

Moskovskiye Novosti (Russian: Московские новости, Moscow News) was a Russian-language daily newspaper in Russia relaunched in 2011. The paper - by then a 'youth-oriented' free sheet handed out at more than 850 places around Moscow - on 23 January 2014 announced that it would cease publication on 1 February that year.

It had been a long-established weekly newspaper aimed at an educated, elite audience. Between 2005 and 2008 it was owned by Arcadi Gaydamak. Much of the paper's content in the Soviet period was translated into English and printed in the English-language Moscow News.

During perestroika, its liberal political stance - and its role as "the bridge between the USSR and the Western world" - gained Moskovskiye Novosti widespread popularity.

The newspaper was established in 1980 and ceased publication on 1 January 2008. International news agency RIA Novosti relaunched it and Moscow News in February 2011 in partnership with the Vremya Publishing House, publisher until 2010 of Vremya Novostei and owner of the Moskovskiye Novosti title. The paper was to be available in print, web and mobile device app formats.

The Moscow city authorities were in March 2014 negotiating to buy the paper for an undisclosed sum from RIA Novosti, which was being broken up by Rossiya Segodnya, a media group created in December 2013 by presidential decree. The paper would help extend the authorities' reach when publicising its policies by complementing the weekly Argumenty i Fakty, which city hall had acquired by agreeing to take over responsibility for its liabilities, sources told the Moscow Times.

RIA Novosti's acting editor-in-chief, Irakly Gachechiladze, in March 2014 told reporters: "The decision has been made to sell [Moskovskiye Novosti] to the Moscow authorities. The conditions of the deal are being agreed on." In January 2014, the Lenta.ru news portal had quoted him as saying: "The sale of the newspaper to the Moscow authorities is decided...Now we will co-ordinate the deal." He had said then that city hall would take over the paper, its website and its editorial staff. Lenta's sources said the committee charged with liquidating RIA Novosti, which December 2013's presidential decree had merged into the new Rossiya Segodnya media group, did not think that paying for the paper's production was 'appropriate'.

In farewell postings dated 24 April 2014 on the paper's vKontakte page, its staff told readers: 'Everyone knows who's to blame, we know what to do...We're sorry to say goodbye to you indefinitely. Our site won't be updated for some time. But we hope that that time will be short and fly by! Until next time! We'll miss you, too!'
