= Marina Tsvigun =

Ukrainian religious sect leader

- Marina Tsvigun
- Born: Marina Viktorovna Mamonova; 28 March 1960 (age 66); Donetsk, Ukrainian SSR, Soviet Union
- Occupations: Religious leader, cult founder
- Years active: 1990–present
- Criminal charge(s): Attempted seizure of state buildings; endangering citizens under guise of religious rites
- Criminal penalty: 4 years imprisonment
- Criminal status: Released 13 August 1997
- Spouses: Mykola Tsvigun; (divorced); Yuri Krivonogov; (divorced); Vitaliy Kovalchuk
- Children: 1 (Vitaly)

Marina Tsvigun (Ukrainian: Марина Цвігун), or Maria Devi Christos by assumed name, (born 1960) is a religious sect leader of the New Community of Enlightened Humanity, also known as YUSMALOS (Note: "YUS" for Youann Swami (AKA Yuri Krivonogov, her co-founder), "MA for Maria, and "Logos" for Jesus)) or "The Great White Brotherhood". Following the collapse of the Soviet Union it was one of the conspicuous New Age movements in the former republics, with about 80,000 members by official count.

== Biography ==
Tsvigun was born in 1960 in Stalino, Ukrainian SSR, USSR. She served as a functionary for the Young Communist League district committee, worked as a newspaper journalist and an editor for Donetsk textile factory radio network.
In 1990 she attended lectures by Yuri Krivonogov, the "White Brotherhood" co-founder, who recognized Tsvigun as a new messiah and later received the role of "Higher Priest" of the Great White Brotherhood.
The members were required to renounce their family ties and donate money and property to the Brotherhood. The Great White Brotherhood came into conflict with the Russian Orthodox Church.

== Arrest and imprisonment ==
Tsvigun predicted the Time of Apocalypse and the coming of the Holy Spirit on November 10, 1993. The event was supposed to be accompanied by her sermons in the Sophia Cathedral. On the appointed day, the members of the Brotherhood stormed the Saint Sophia Cathedral in Kyiv and were arrested.

According to the report of the Orthodox Church, Kyiv City Court found Tsvigun and Krivonogov guilty of violating citizens' health under the guise of religious ceremonies and seizing by force. They were sentenced to 4 and 7 years in prison. The White Brotherhood protested to the United Nations and the International Court. Six months later, in August 1997, Tsvigun was freed as a part of an amnesty on the 6th anniversary of the independence of Ukraine.

== After prison ==
After serving the term, Tsvigun changed her name and surname to Victoria Victorovna Preobrazhenskaya and married John-Peter II, a brotherhood member (real name Peter Kovalchuk). Under the name of Victoria, she started a new multidimensional project "Cosmic Poliart of the Third Millennium of Victoria Preobrazhenskaya" and tried to renew the Great White Brotherhood registration as a public organization, which was denied.

She continued her activities and organized "The Mystic College of Isis and Her Followers."

As of November 2008, she lived in Russia, where she ran an art gallery, "Dom Solntsa".

She published doctrine pamphlets "The Science about Light and Its Transformation" (available in Russian) and "The Last Testament of the Mother of the World", both written by her in prison.

In 2011 she started a new magazine called “Victoria RA”, which is available on her website.

== See also ==
- List of people who have claimed to be Jesus
- Messiah complex
- List of messiah claimants
