= White Brotherhood (religious group) =

Eschatological religious movement in Ukraine

Founder
- Yuri Krivonogov

Regions with significant populations
- Kyiv (Ukraine)

Languages
- Russian

"The Great White Brotherhood YUSMALOS" (commonly known in the media as the "White Brotherhood") is an eschatological religious movement that emerged in the early 1990s in Ukraine. Its teachings combine elements of Christianity with other religions, especially Dharmic traditions, and theosophy. The Brotherhood's activities peaked on November 10, 1993, when members attempted to take over St. Sophia's Cathedral in Kyiv, Ukraine with plans for mass suicide. After the arrest of its founders, the Brotherhood continued to exist as separate groups. The acronym YUSMALOS combines the initials of its three components: YUS (Yuoan Swami, i.e., Krivonogov himself), MA (Maria Devi, also known as Marina Tsvigun), and LOS (the planetary Logos).

== History ==
Founded in 1990–1991 in Kyiv by Yuri Krivonogov, a specialist in psychological influence, cybernetics engineer and candidate of technical sciences, and journalist Marina Tsvigun.

Yuri Krivonogov initiated the movement in 1988, creating the "Institute of Man" and giving lectures on meditation and spiritual practices. He was previously involved in the International Society for Krishna Consciousness but was expelled for claiming to be Krishna’s avatar. In 1990, he met Marina Tsvigun, who later became the group's figurehead, proclaimed as the "Living God Maria Devi Christos," while Krivonogov took the name Yoann Swami.

In 1991, "The Great White Brotherhood YUSMALOS" was officially registered. Its members were called "Yusmalians". It functioned as a religious community with a strict hierarchy and discipline, consisting mainly of young people under twenty, including minors. According to Krivonogov's teachings, the "Great White Brotherhood YUSMALOS" had the mission to spread mystical knowledge to save people from the impending world destruction, predicted to occur on November 24, 1993. Active missionary work took place in various regions of Ukraine, marked by members wearing white clothes. Communities were officially registered in Kyiv and Cherkasy, and the movement later spread to Russia, Lithuania, Kazakhstan, Bulgaria, Poland, and Czechoslovakia.

=== Rapture of the Cathedral of St. Sophia of Kyiv ===
The culmination of the Brotherhood's activities was the attempt by the Yusmalians on November 10, 1993 to seize the Sophia Cathedral in Kyiv and commit mass suicide inside it by self-immolation.

At the beginning of 1993 (according to other sources, in the spring of 1992), Kryvonogov, who declared himself a "prophet of the Mother of the World", spread information about the date of the Last Judgment on November 24, 1993. He called on all Yusmalians to gather in Kyiv for mass suicide and resurrection in three days.

Later, the date of the promotion was moved to November 10, in anticipation of the end of the world on November 11. A campaign against the "White Brotherhood" was launched in the Ukrainian media, some Kyiv schools shortened classes that day for the safety of students. The Russian Orthodox Church and the Ukrainian Orthodox Church excommunicated Maryna Tsvihun from their churches, and the Brotherhood was declared anathema.

On November 10, Yusmalians entered the Sophia Cathedral, cut off the telephone connection and blocked the exits. Tsvihun and Krivonogov climbed the bishop's chair and expected self-immolation from the Brotherhood; they promised to commit suicide as a last resort. According to another version, one of the Yusmalians was supposed to shoot Zvigun and thus trigger the death of the world, but he got scared and did not shoot.

Police authorities prevented the suicide, and twenty-five followers of the Brotherhood were arrested for organizing riots, more than six hundred of the most active members of the Brotherhood were detained; they went on hunger strike. A week later, in her appeal, Zvigun allowed them to stop their hunger strike.

=== Disintegration ===
In 1996, Marina Tsvigun, Yuri Krivonogov, and another leader, Viktor Kovalchuk, were sentenced to four, seven, and six years of imprisonment, respectively, for organizing mass riots, seizing state and public buildings, and assaulting the health of citizens under the pretext of performing religious ceremonies. After their imprisonment, there was a split in the Brotherhood between followers of Mary Devi Christ and Joanna Swami. Even during the investigation, Tsvigun broke up with Kryvonohov, describing him as a traitor and claimed that it was he who called for self-immolation. The activities of the Brotherhood in Ukraine were banned, and also condemned in Russia.

After his release from prison, Krivonogov recognized his actions related to the organization of the "Great White Brotherhood of Yusmalos" as wrong, broke off relations with the Yusmalians, and after his second marriage took the surname of his wife (Sylvestrov) and chose a secluded lifestyle.

Marina Tsvigun was released early in 1997. She married Vitaliy Kovalchuk and began efforts to revive the "Great White Brotherhood YUSMALOS." Attempts to officially register it in Ukraine were unsuccessful. The Brotherhood's groups went underground, maintaining secret communication and movement across the CIS.

In 2005-2006, Tsvihun moved the center of her activity to Moscow and changed her name to Viktoriya Preobrazhenska. She became the founder of a number of organizations of artistic and esoteric direction ("Unions of Holy Love", "Cosmic Polyarts of the Third Millennium", "Theatre of Mysteries"). Criticized the Orange Revolution and the Revolution of Dignity, calling them the consequences of foreign manipulation. She supported the former president of Ukraine Viktor Yanukovych. She promoted the refusal of passports and group isolation from the rest of society.

On July 19, 2013, by the decision of the Egoryev Court of the Moscow Region, the literature of the "White Brotherhood" was recognized as extremist and is subject to inclusion in the Federal List of Extremist Materials. On the basis of an examination conducted by the Russian Institute of Cultural Studies, the court found that the literature of the "White Brotherhood" contains chauvinistic statements and calls for religious enmity.

== Later analysis ==
In 2021, the Ukrainian documentary film "With Feet on the Altar" was released about the "White Brotherhood". This is one of nine films in the "Our Thirty" series about turning events in the history of independent Ukraine in the 1990s.

During an interview with journalist Gordon, Viktor Shokin, Prosecutor General of Ukraine (10 February 2015 – 3 April 2016) stated:

"He (Krivonogikh) was simply the one who was being led, he was carrying out some mission. Not for the good of the white brothers and sisters, but for the good of those who ordered this mission from him." To the journalist's clarifying question, "that is, intelligence agencies?" he replied, "I think so."

This confirms the theory that arose in 1990 and became popular in the 2010-2020s, about the creation of the "White Brotherhood" as an experiment by the government (sometimes specifically the KGB of the USSR) to influence broad sections of the population. According to the theory, Tsvigun and Krivonogov were not its real leaders

== See also ==
- Brotherhood (Ukrainian political party)

== See also ==
- People's Temple
