= Vremya Novostei =

Vremya Novostei (Russian: Время новостей, translated as News Time) was a Russian business socio-political daily newspaper based in Moscow.

Vremya Novostei was founded in 2000 by former Vremya MN newspaper journalists led by editor-in-chief Vladimir Gurevich retiring in consequence of the non-payment of wages. The first issue was published on March 16, 2000, and the last issue was published on December 17, 2010.

In February 2011, Vremya Novostei was relaunched as Moskovskiye Novosti, but ceased publication in February 2014.
