= Staraya Kriusha =

Staraya Kriusha Старая Криуша
- Selo
- Location within Voronezh Oblast Location within Russia
- Coordinates: 50°12′N 41°09′E
- Country: Russia
- Region: Voronezh Oblast
- District: Petropavlovsky District
- Time zone: UTC+3:00

Staraya Kriusha (Russian: Старая Криуша) is a rural locality (a selo) and the administrative center of Starokriushanskoye Rural Settlement, Petropavlovsky District, Voronezh Oblast, Russia. The population was 2,544 as of 2010. There are 28 streets.

== Geography ==
Staraya Kriusha is located 37 km northeast of Petropavlovka (the district's administrative centre) by road. Novotroitskoye is the nearest rural locality.
