= Dmitri Furman =

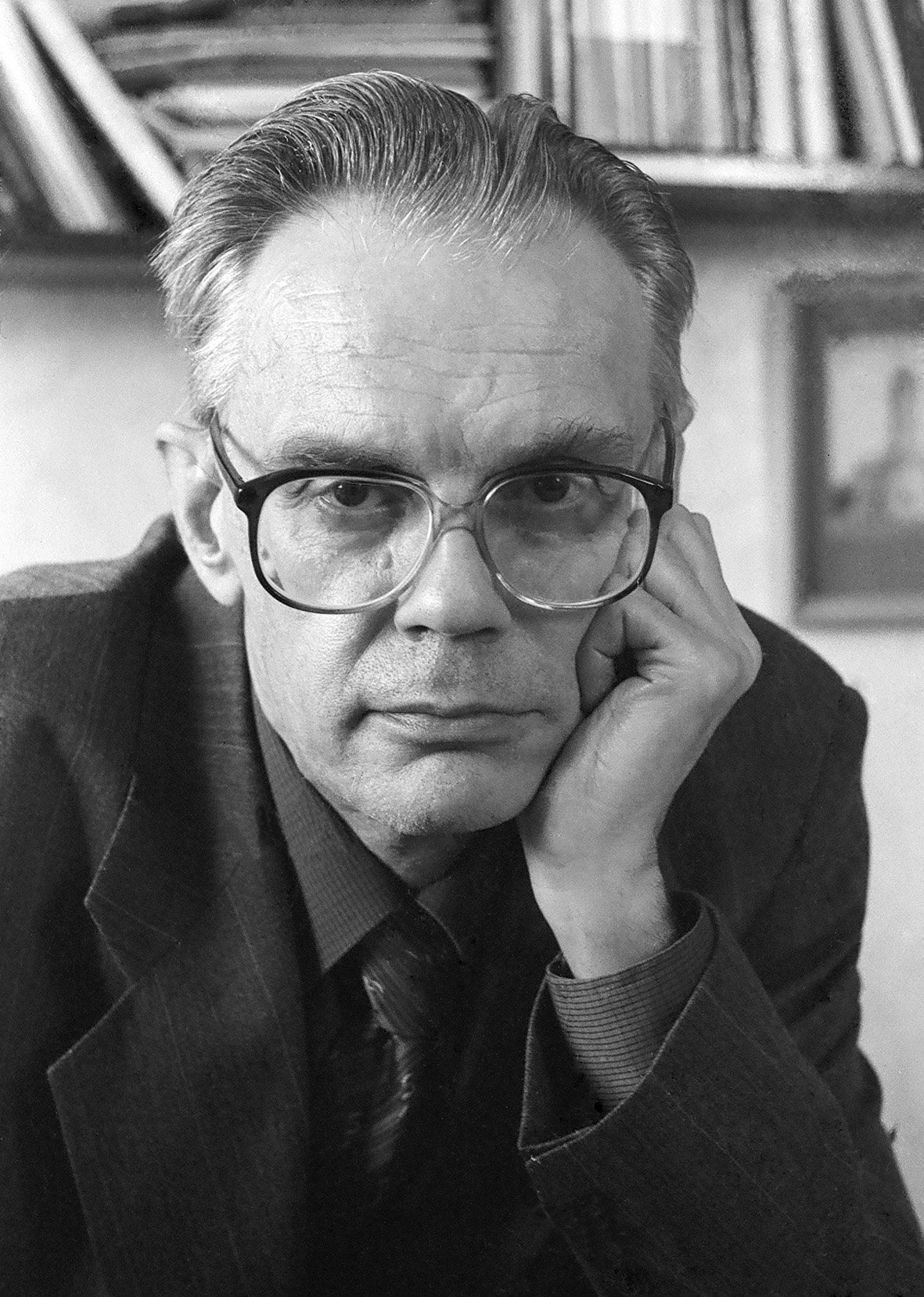

Dmitri Yefimovich Furman (Russian: Дми́трий Ефи́мович Фу́рман Dmitrij Yefimovič Furman; 28 February 1943 – 22 July 2011) was a Russian political scientist, sociologist, and expert on religions. The New Left Review called him "Russia’s leading comparative scholar on the political systems of post-Soviet states". Dmitri Furman was born in Moscow, graduated from Moscow State University (1965), and defended his PhD thesis "Religion and social conflicts in US" in 1981. In later years, Furman undertook as editor or sole author, a series of studies of the former Soviet periphery: collections on Ukraine (1997), Belarus (1998), Chechnya (1999), Azerbaijan (2001), the Baltic States (2002), a monograph on Kazakhstan (2004), and dozens of separate essays and articles. Also, continuing with his earlier specialization, he produced works on religion in post-Soviet Russia as well as a collection of his political journalism Our Last Ten Years (2001).

== Background and early life ==
Furman was born in 1943, the only child from the first short lasting marriage of his mother and an artist Sergey Victorov. He was brought up by his grandmother and her sister, whose brother was Boris Ioganson, a leading socialist realist painter of the time and president of the Soviet Academy of Arts when Furman was a teenager. Later his mother married two Jewish husbands, the first, Yefim Furman (Mifasov) was an artist who gave Dmitri his surname.

== Academic career ==
Furman chose ancient history as his subject at university because the field was too arcane for much interference by officialdom. He also wanted to compare the theological disputes of early Christianity with the quarrels of the early RSDLP, whose minutes he was also reading. In 1968 he completed a dissertation on Julian the Apostate, whose correspondence he translated. A year earlier, he had published his first piece in Novy Mir, remarking of a recent discussion of the Asiatic mode of production that the strong disagreements it aroused were to be welcomed as normal and natural in the development of any science, the absence of which could only be a morbid symptom.

Furman was able to transfer from the history to the philosophy faculty at Moscow University; thereafter he went to the Institute for Study of the Labour Movement, and at the end of the 1970s he went to the Institute for Study of the United States and Canada at the Academy of Sciences. During his academic career Furman was often urged to drop his Jewish surname. He declined out of loyalty to the memory of his stepfather. Furman felt no impulse to political action and had no particular ambition for power or money. Academic by temperament, he loved books, shunned clamor, and was averse to meetings of any sort.

== Work ==
In conditions of isolation, as Furman himself remarked, Russian thinkers of his generation were inevitably in some degree autodidacts, always liable to reinvent the bicycle. Furman was also, as his friend and best commentator Georgi Derluguian noted, by temperament a pragmatic researcher, little interested in intellectual genealogies or engagement with parallel bodies of work.

His first book, Religion and Social Conflicts in the USA (1981), focused on the role of Protestantism in American history and society. Furman's book on the United States offered a detailed empirical sociology of American churches, denominations and sects in the 20th century. Its focus became the hallmark of his comparative work henceforward: the influence of religion on not the economic but the political life of society. Why, Furman asks at the outset, had France known four revolutions since the 18th century, and some 15 constitutions, and the United States just one of each? Bourgeois society in America, he argued, had from the beginning combined exceptional dynamism with extreme stability: a combination that could not be understood apart from the peculiar salience of Protestantism in its formation. America included both the unfettering of a drive for knowledge and a biblical respect for the immutability of the constitution. Though officially church and state were separated, the reigning ideology of the nation mingled religious rituals and symbols with secular forms and themes in a promiscuous potpourri whose very lack of clear divisions or borders was permissive of continual economic and social change.
